= Ragnarök (Gwar album) =

Studio album by Gwar
- Released: October 24, 1995
- Recorded: 1995
- Genres: Heavy metal; crossover thrash; comedy rock
- Length: 47:11
- Label: Metal Blade Records
- Producer: Robert Margouleff

Gwar chronology
This Toilet Earth (1994)	Ragnarök (1995)	Carnival of Chaos (1997)

Professional ratings
Review scores
Source	Rating
Allmusic	2/5 stars
Collector's Guide to Heavy Metal	7/10

Ragnarök is the fifth studio album by the American heavy metal band Gwar. It was released on October 24, 1995, on Metal Blade Records and contains the most varied vocal stylings of any Gwar album, with the majority of band members singing at least one track.

== Background ==
Ragnarök is essentially a heavy metal album spiced with a story about the end of the world. The story involves Oderus and his alien sister Slymenstra being forcibly mated with the aid of rogue space aliens. Meanwhile, a comet hurtling towards planet Earth is inciting the populace to revolt, and anarchy has set in all over the globe. An AIDS-like plague has crippled the masses ("The New Plague" is sung, by Dave Brockie, as a human with AIDS), who await the meteor's arrival and their subsequent death. However, it turns out that the comet is actually Cardinal Syn, a robotic agent of harsh Catholic dogma. Syn is representing the Warrior Pope, who is demanding that all bow down to him and obey his insane whims. But Syn is drawn to Slymenstra's alien baby, for a reason that is left for the listener to uncover...

== Content ==
As it could be supposed, the concept of the album is about the ridicule of Christianity (especially in the song, "Martyr Dumb"). The highlights of the album include "Dirty, Filthy" (a rousing comedy anthem), the title track (featuring the final appearance of Chuck Varga as Sexecutioner on a Gwar album), and "Meat Sandwich". Don Drakulich does a mock-rapping bit as Sleazy P. Martini on "Think You Outta Know This" (a song about ripping people off. It's Sleazy's last album appearance), and there is an energetic duet between Brockie as Oderus and Danielle Stampe as Slymenstra in "Fire in the Loins". "Crush, Kill, Destroy" features new bassist Casey Orr (having replaced Michael Bishop as Beefcake the Mighty) on lead vocals for the first time (he would also sing lead on Carnival of Chaos two years later). The one song featuring a character exclusive to the storyline is "Surf of Syn" – though the vocals aren't the main emphasis of the song, Hunter Jackson as Cardinal Syn does a vocal style similar to death growling. This brings the total number of vocalists up to six – Brockie, Orr, Stampe, Drakulich, Varga and Jackson.

This album, as well as having a variety of vocal stylings, also features a musical side of Gwar not found in previous albums. Nowhere is this more apparent than in "Surf of Syn." This song is the biggest change in Gwar's musical style (from the usual punk and metal to metal-fused surf) until 1997 (with "Sex Cow" and "Don't Need a Man," both from Carnival of Chaos). The keyboard is used heavily on this album, as well, courtesy of Dave Musel. In particular, "Meat Sandwich" features powerful sforzando notes (similar to Oderus' vocals in attack).

Ragnarök's songs are not performed in concert as frequently as songs from the other albums (specifically the albums Scumdogs of the Universe, America Must Be Destroyed, Violence Has Arrived and War Party), though the album's closer, "None But The Brave", made a comeback on the Black Death Rager Tour. With Gwar's change in musical style towards heavy metal (as opposed to punk-metal, or the surf-metal found only on this album), and with the absence of all but one of the album's vocalists (Beefcake), the number of usable songs from the album is limited (usually just to "Crush, Kill, Destroy" although "Meat Sandwich" was a staple in the 2006 Beyond Hell tour).

== Videos ==
Like Gwar's other albums, Ragnarök spawned a video: "Rendezvous with Ragnarök." This featured a paranormal investigator (played by Bob Gorman, a member of Slave Pit Inc.) interviewing Techno Destructo, Beefcake the Mighty, Balsac the Jaws of Death, and Flattus Maximus. In between the interview segments, live footage from the 1995 Ragnarök N' Roll Tour (though the music is dubbed from the album, not the concerts) tells the story outlined by the interviews. This video features the most speaking Flattus Maximus has ever done. "Rendezvous with Ragnarök" features three music videos: "Saddam A Go-Go" (though from 1994's This Toilet Earth, the video featured footage from the Skulhedface tour, after the movie "Skulhedface" was released), "Meat Sandwich" and "Surf of Syn." The version of "Sonderkommando" is not the studio version found on "This Toilet Earth;" it features the Pledge of Allegiance sung to the music, as well as a line from "By-Tor and the Snow Dog" by Rush. "Think You Outta Know This" was never performed on the Ragnarök N' Roll Tour; Drakulich stopped touring after Ragnarök was released. It was taken from the 1996 Halloween Slaugh-Tour, though it used the album's music.

The "Surf of Syn" video was the first video recorded for Ragnarök, and was done on a very limited budget. "Meat Sandwich" was probably also limited in resources, though there were no props or sets to be made. The band was almost arrested for making the video, as they walked around the capitol building in Richmond, Virginia, in full costume (with no permits, and quite exposed) and simulated someone (Oderus) being hit by a car (which belonged to Jizmak Da Gusha).

== Track listing ==
No.	Title	Length
1.	"Meat Sandwich"	3:29
2.	"The New Plague"	2:52
3.	"Whargoul"	5:37
4.	"RagNaRok" (Vocals by Sexecutioner)	3:59
5.	"Dirty, Filthy"	2:30
6.	"Stalin's Organs"	2:19
7.	"Knife in Yer Guts"	3:15
8.	"Think You Outta Know This" (Vocals by Sleazy P. Martini)	2:46
9.	"Martyr Dumb"	3:57
10.	"Nudged"	2:39
11.	"Fire in the Loins" (Vocals by Oderus Urungus & Slymenstra Hymen)	3:58
12.	"Surf of Syn" (Vocals by Cardinal Syn)	4:22
13.	"Crush, Kill, Destroy" (Vocals by Beefcake the Mighty)	1:34
14.	"None But the Brave"	3:50

== Personnel ==
- Dave Brockie (Oderus Urungus) – Lead vocals
- Pete Lee (Flattus Maximus) – Lead guitar, backing vocals
- Mike Derks (Balsac the Jaws of Death) – Rhythm guitar, backing vocals
- Casey Orr (Beefcake the Mighty) – Bass, backing vocals, lead vocals on "Crush, Kill, Destroy"
- Brad Roberts (Jizmak Da Gusha) – Drums
- Dave Musel (Müsel) – Keyboards, samples
- Danielle Stampe (Slymenstra Hymen) – Lead vocals on "Fire in the Loins"
- Chuck Varga (Sexecutioner) – Lead vocals on "RagNaRok"
- Don Drakulich (Sleazy P. Martini) – Lead vocals on "Think You Outta Know This"
- Hunter Jackson (Cardinal Syn) – Lead vocals on "Surf of Syn" (Uncredited)
- Jenna Anderson – Backing vocals on "None But the Brave"
