= We Kill Everything =

Studio album by Gwar
- Released: April 6, 1999
- Recorded: 1998–1999
- Genres: Crossover thrash, punk rock
- Length: 54:01
- Label: Metal Blade Records
- Producers: Gwar, Grant Rutledge, Mark Miley

Gwar chronology
Carnival of Chaos (1997)	We Kill Everything (1999)	You're All Worthless and Weak (2000)

Professional ratings
Review scores
Source	Rating
Allmusic	3/5 stars
Collector's Guide to Heavy Metal	6/10

We Kill Everything is the seventh studio album by American heavy metal band Gwar, released on April 6, 1999, through Metal Blade Records.

== Story ==
The album's story differs slightly from the version told in "It's Sleazy" and on tour.

The first three tracks on the album do not follow one particular story, and focus on Gwar's generally decadent ways. The fourth, "A Short History of the End of the World (Part VII (The Final Chapter (abbr.)))", begins (though an instrumental, it is explained that it refers to Gwar fighting the Master, the incident that led to their exile) the story, which continues through the title track.

This story chronicles Gwar's relationship with their Master, and the aftermath of their defiance. While Gwar was exiled to Earth, mystic Scumdog Scroda Moon went to search for them, only to be stranded on the Moon with a tablet (that he himself carved, according to the movie and concerts) that supposedly chronicles all of time's events from the beginning to the end. After landing on Earth, Gwar somehow gets a hold of the tablet, and breaks it into pieces, which are promptly stolen (the album does not go into any more detail beyond this) and must be returned, else the Master would come to destroy Gwar.

Moon, dismissed as a crackpot, summons his inter-dimensional "portal potty" to assist them in their search - to which Gwar agree, on the condition that he smoke crack and drink with them. After his initiation, and combat with various creatures holding the pieces, Scroda's limbs are separated from his body and he dies, only to be revived and improved by Slymenstra Hymen.

The mock country tune "The Master Has a Butt" deals with the Master, and Gwar's final showdown. The title track concludes the story, with Gwar emerging victorious.

The last five tracks have nothing to do with the story, and deal with specific instances of Gwar's decadence (as do the first three). Scroda Moon is not mentioned again.

== Overview ==
The band once again offers the funny ("Fishfuck") the gross ("Babyraper"), and the weird ("Penile Drip"). Mike Derks lends his vocals to the almost sensitive punk ballad, "Mary Anne". This album is mostly a collection of gruesomely corny jokes ("Fuckin' An Animal" and "Nitro Burning Funny Bong"), and contains significantly less brutality and heart than their previous works. "A Short History of the End of the World (Part VII(The Final Chapter(abbr.)))" is the first true Gwar instrumental (the title track from America Must Be Destroyed is a collection of samples over an instrumental track, and "Surf of Syn" on RagNaRok has Cardinal Syn's voice in the background), and showcases the musical capabilities of the band collective.

The lyrical content of We Kill Everything is in response to angry fans' complaints about the disgusting lyrics on Carnival of Chaos (or lack thereof). It is also the final Gwar album featuring Michael Bishop, who returned for a few months to replace Casey Orr as Beefcake the Mighty, Hunter Jackson (who would stay with the group until the end of 2000), Danielle Stampe (who toured until 2002), and Dave Musel on keyboards and samples. Bishop also brought along Tim Harriss, both of Kepone, to play lead guitar as Flattus Maximus. We Kill Everything is also the last album in the "Scumdogs" storyline (though "The Song of Words" on Violence Has Arrived and "Gwarnography" on Lust in Space make reference to it).

Some of the songs are themselves as old as Scumdogs of the Universe, and at least three are remakes of older songs ("A Short History of the End of the World" being a remake of the "Cardinal Syn Theme" from 1989, and "Escape from the Mooselodge", a remake of "The Needle," which featured BalSac the Jaws of Death on vocals for the first time with Gwar; the former can be heard in the video "It's Sleazy," and the latter on Slaves Going Single; "Tune from Da Moon" is a remake of the Death Piggy song "Minute 2 Live", with new lyrics).

The title track was tied as one of the two longest songs written by the band (Carnival of Chaos's "Sammy," at 6:57 being the other) until the band released "War On GWAR" (7:21) on 2017's The Blood of Gods.

This is the first Gwar album not to feature Beefcake the Mighty on lead vocals since 1988, and Violence Has Arrived would continue that trend. "Jiggle the Handle" is the only song to feature Beefcake, as well as every other vocalist on the album, save one: "Balsac the Jaws of Death." It also has the distinction of being the Gwar song with the most vocalists actually singing—five (Scroda Moon, Portal Potty, Oderus, Beefcake and Slymenstra). It is tied with RagNaRok for having the most vocalists (six—Jackson, Brockie, Stampe, Derks, Bishop and Bob Gorman). There are eight distinct characters on the album: the six aforementioned, a narrator on "Escape from the Mooselodge," voiced by Dave Brockie (the song features him as the narrator and as Oderus), and former Gwar guitarist Cornelius Carnage (played by Greg Ottinger, though he originally played Stephen Sphincter) on "Jagermonsta".

We Kill Everything is the only other Gwar album to have been censored (the first was 1994's This Toilet Earth). The profanities are changed to various noises, and the titles "Fishfuck" and "Fuckin' An Animal" were omitted from the back cover. There also exists a Canadian release that too is censored on the back of the album, but is completely uncensored in the lyrics. There is another version that says "Censored Version" on the disc, yet actually has the back cover and the CD both fully uncensored.

== Videos ==
Like many of Gwar's albums, We Kill Everything spawned a movie: 2001's It's Sleazy. Featured in this film is one of two music videos for the album: "Nitro Burnin' Funny Bong." In the 2002 "Ultimate Video Gwarchive" music video collection, Brockie states in the commentary for this video his disdain for this song, and most of the output from the time period of 1997–2000. Several parts of the song (including the entire second verse) are omitted from the video; in the "Ultimate Video Gwarchive" commentary, Mike Derks states that an entire reel of footage is missing (a reel which, presumably, contains the second verse).

The second video, "Fuckin' An Animal," was recorded well before "It's Sleazy," and was not in the movie. It is available, albeit censored, in the "Ultimate Video Gwarchive." It marks the first appearance of Zach Blair as Flattus Maximus, as well as the final appearance of Flattus' tail.

== Band dismissal ==
The members of Gwar seldom discuss We Kill Everything in interviews. A news post on their website reads "...and the world breathed a collective sigh of relief that we hadn’t put out another “We Kill Everything”, no matter how much they might have enjoyed having sex with animals!", suggesting their dislike for the album. Since the Gwarmageddon 1999 tour, only "Babyraper" has remained a constant in their setlist, though their wrestling tours used "A Short History..." during the second match of the night. This could either be due to their dislike of the album, or the fact that because most of the songs deal with a specific concept or have a former member, they are unable to be played (though in soundcheck before their concerts, they do play "Short History of the End of the World"). Brockie (Oderus Urungus) particularly disliked the song "Nitro-Burnin' Funny Bong," which he described as "extremely annoying," along with the entire "It's Sleazy" video. However, Brockie, Derks and Brad Roberts (Jizmak Da Gusha) played "Nitro-Burnin' Funny Bong" as the Dave Brockie eXperience, along with other Gwar songs (including "Fishfuck;" another We Kill Everything song that the band no longer plays live). Also, on Gwar's 2006 DVD, titled "Blood Bath and Beyond," Oderus Urungus and Sleazy P. Martini describe Scroda Moon as "the stupidest Gwar character."

When it was active, Gwar's message board made it explicitly clear not to make mention of We Kill Everything, stating that those who did would be banned from the forum. However, as seen on a recent post from their website detailing the latest "GWAR-BQ" and the 30th Anniversary of the band, lead guitarist Brent Purgason did hint at the album title openly on its home page; stating that "I have yet to grasp this concept of the internet and the spouting of self-important speeches by people in social media; the INTERNET MUST DIE, so GWAR will KILL IT!. Management tells me the internet is not a person that can be fought and killed, but they don’t know the true power of a Scumdog. WE KILL EVERYTHING!”

It has been hinted by the Gwar members from around this time (including Danielle Stampe) that this is the band's least successful album, both in record sales and on tour.

== Track listing ==
No.	Title	Length
1.	"Babyraper"	2:35
2.	"Fishfuck"	1:45
3.	"The Performer"	3:23
4.	"A Short History of the End of the World (Part VII (The Final Chapter (abbr.)))" (Instrumental)	3:27
5.	"Escape from the Moose Lodge"	5:24
6.	"Tune from Da Moon" (Vocals by Scroda Moon)	2:26
7.	"Jiggle the Handle" (Vocals by Scroda Moon, Portal Potty, Oderus Urungus, Beefcake the Mighty, & Slymenstra Hymen)	5:28
8.	"Nitro-Burnin' Funny Bong"	3:27
9.	"Jagermonsta"	2:50
10.	"My Girly Ways" (Vocals by Slymenstra Hymen)	2:59
11.	"The Master Has a Butt"	4:05
12.	"We Kill Everything"	6:57
13.	"Child"	2:51
14.	"Penile Drip"	2:38
15.	"Mary Anne" (Vocals by Balsac the Jaws of Death)	2:42
16.	"Friend"	1:17
17.	"Fuckin' An Animal"	3:08

== Personnel ==
- Dave Brockie (Oderus Urungus) – lead vocals
- Tim Harris (Flattus Maximus) – lead guitar, backing vocals
- Mike Derks (Balsac the Jaws of Death) – rhythm guitar, backing vocals, lead vocals on "Mary Anne"
- Mike Bishop (Beefcake the Mighty) – bass, backing vocals
- Brad Roberts (Jizmak Da Gusha) – drums, percussion
- Hunter Jackson (Scroda Moon) – lead vocals on "Tune from Da Moon" and "Jiggle the Handle"
- Danielle Stampe (Slymenstra Hymen) – lead vocals on "My Girly Ways" and "Jiggle the Handle"
- Bob Gorman (Portal Potty) – Additional vocals on "Jiggle the Handle" (uncredited)
