= Skulhedface (video) =

Video by Gwar
- Released: 1994
- Recorded: 1993–94
- Genre: Thrash metal, punk rock
- Length: 60 min
- Label: Metal Blade
- Director: Mel Mandl, Hunter Jackson, Dave Brockie
- Producer: Slave Pit, Inc.

Gwar chronology
TVD (1992)	Skulhedface (1994)	Return of Techno-Destructo (1996)

Professional ratings
Review scores
Source	Rating
Allmusic	1.5/5 stars

Skulhedface is a 1994 movie that was directed by Melanie Mandl. It is yet another story in Gwar's grand storyline (about the ne'er-do-well Scumdogs of the Universe), and the third to be released on video.

== Story ==
Skulhedface being the movie coinciding with This Toilet Earth, the story of both album and movie are nearly identical (though the album diverges from that story frequently). Skulhedface, formerly a beautiful queen of a peaceful, vegetarian planet, was transformed into a foul creature during a raid on her planet by Cardinal Syn, Gwar's eternal foe. She travels to Earth, where she is instructed to acquire sufficient amounts of Jizmoglobin, a blue bodily fluid that is responsible for the creativity, rebellion and decadence of all creatures.

Gwar, meanwhile, is hosting a telethon on their pirate television network, Slave Pit TV. The goal of the telethon: offer enough human sacrifices to unite with the World Maggot, which lies dormant in the Earth's core, and ride it off the planet. They are having an increasing amount of success, which draws the attention of GlomCo, an archetypical evil media conglomerate.

Boss Glom, the CEO, summons Gwar's manager, Sleazy P. Martini, in the hopes that he will sell Gwar out, reduce them to commodities, and ultimately kill the band to prevent any interference. Martini repeatedly refuses, until he is offered more money than he has ever seen in his life. At this point, Gwar breaks through the ceiling, and Boss Glom summons his armed guards. Gwar makes short work of the guards and the other board members, but Glom escapes to his private elevator. After that, Slave Pit TV is then broadcast to the public, having taken over the equipment as well as the corporation.

On the way down to a secret laboratory, Boss Glom is revealed to be Skulhedface, and in her laboratory, her assistant, Flopsy, assists her to a large Jizmoglobin extraction device. Rocker Sebastian Bach is placed in the device, his Jizmoglobin removed, and emerges a business type with absolutely no personality. Skulhedface starts to drink the Jizmoglobin, when a transmission from Cardinal Syn comes in - he will "be arriving in the next movie" (which he does) to collect Jizmoglobin and subjugate the planet (which he attempts to do, but fails).

Meanwhile, the telethon is still going well, and Gwar feasts their imminent departure from the planet. Beefcake the Mighty, however, spots Flopsy, who has come to lure him into a trap. Skulhedface removes his face, dons it herself, and tells Gwar of midgets in the basement (with which they could sate their sexual appetite one last time before leaving).

When they get to the basement, they find Beefcake, tied up and without a face. During a conversation with Skulhedface, Flopsy returns Beefcake's face, and in return, decides to stick his fist in Flopsy's mouth (which is vaginal in shape). Unfortunately, he is too rough, and Flopsy dies.

Skulhedface reveals her greatest weapon - the Flesh Column, composed of the foulest of human pieces. The combined efforts of Gwar are insufficient, and they are subjected to the device, which is overloaded with their combined Jizmoglobin. Skulhedface is reverted to her old self, and Gwar into infants. Now benevolent, she returns their Jizmoglobin, and things return to as they were. The entire band (minus Slymenstra Hymen) rapes her to death. At that moment, the World Maggot finally awakens, and begins to fly with Gwar's stronghold on its back. Gwar hurriedly returns to the surface and try to wave down the Maggot, only for it to blast off into space without them. Balsac considers whether there might be "two World Maggots" as the band begins bickering amongst themselves. Sleazy P. Martini "consoles" them and concludes the broadcast day.

== Music videos ==
This Toilet Earth had three music videos: "Saddam a Go-Go", "The Insidious Soliloquy of Skulhedface" and "Jack the World." Two of these videos, "The Insidious Soliloquy of Skulhedface" and "Jack the World", were filmed during the making of this movie (the former actually being a portion of the movie itself). "Saddam a Go-Go" used footage (and new bassist Casey Orr) from the tour corresponding with the album and film, and was not in the final release.

== Miscellaneous ==
- This was to be the first film in which guitarist Peter Lee plays Flattus Maximus, but he was recovering from a gunshot wound to his stomach. He is seen in one of the commercials as a police officer - it was during the filming of this scene that he and Dave Brockie, the other police officer, came up with the idea for X-Cops - but in no other. Flattus Maximus was portrayed by two other people, as Lee was absent for most of it. "Jack the World" was his first video, and it featured him wearing a colostomy bag.
- Skulhedface is the final film to feature Michael Bishop (bassist) as Beefcake the Mighty; he left the band shortly after filming.
- This was filmed at the height of Gwar's popularity, and featured a number of well-known people: Boss Glom was portrayed by Jello Biafra, and Sebastian Bach appears as himself.
- Melanie Mandl, the director, was also a voice (Lady D) on the MC Rhythmless Slave Pit Single, a series of non-album recordings released to the Total Slavery Fan Club, and was Gwar's main videographer. She left shortly after the album's tour cycle.
- This film was originally going to be in theaters, but that did not happen, as the MPAA refused to rate it anything other than NC-17, saying there was no way to cut it for an R.
- During the telethon, parody commercials were featured, including "Sperm-N-Slide" among others.
