= Carnival of Chaos =

Studio album by Gwar
- Released: March 25, 1997
- Recorded: 1997
- Genres: Heavy metal, punk rock
- Length: 74:36
- Label: Metal Blade Records
- Producers: Ron Goudie, Mike Derks (uncredited)

Gwar chronology
Ragnarök (1995)	Carnival of Chaos (1997)	We Kill Everything (1999)

Professional ratings
Review scores
Source	Rating
Allmusic	4/5 stars
Collector's Guide to Heavy Metal	6/10

Carnival of Chaos is the sixth studio album by American heavy metal band Gwar, released on March 25, 1997, by Metal Blade Records.

== Overview ==
The album is Gwar's longest album (exceeding 74 minutes), and contains Stampe's solo number: "Don't Need a Man". Hunter Jackson also returns in "The Private Pain of Techno Destructo", and there is a ballad entitled "Sammy" about the rotting corpse of Sammy Davis Jr. "In Her Fear" is Oderus's swan song, and Beefcake the Mighty gives a memorable song in "Hate Love Songs" - Casey Orr's last song as a lead vocalist with the band until his return on Lust in Space.

Carnival of Chaos is the last Gwar album to feature Peter Lee as Flattus Maximus. Due to recurring stomach problems stemming from a gunshot wound sustained in a carjacking four years prior, he left the band shortly after the 1997 Halloween Tour.

"Don't Need A Man" was not originally meant to be a Gwar song. It was supposed to be just Danielle Stampe (Slymenstra Hymen) singing and Michael Derks (Balsac the Jaws of Death) on piano. It ended up featuring Brad Roberts (Jizmak Da Gusha), Derks (sequencing the upright bass part, the piano and the guitar) and Stampe. Derks produced the track, but received no credit. Additionally, Derks wrote "Hate Love Songs," and was initially going to sing the lead, but opted instead to have Orr (Beefcake) do it. He is still heard in the background.

Approximately nine minutes after "Don't Need A Man" is a clip of "Drop Drawers." This was supposed to appear on the album, along with a complete version of "The Private Pain of Techno Destructo." The latter had to be changed, due to Paramount's refusal to give permission to use music from the 1967 Star Trek episode, "Amok Time". There is a "Slave Pit Single, released after this album, that features it. The former, which included a cover of Billy Thorpe's "Children of the Sun," had to be cut, save for a short clip at the end.

"Drop Drawers" can be found on Slaves Going Single, an extremely rare B-sides collection released between We Kill Everything and Violence Has Arrived on Slave Pit Records. The latter can be heard, minus the unlicensed cover, on the album just after Techno sings "You'll just make me...", and the full song (except for a slight cut-off of Techno at the end) on the Rawgwar Slave Pit Single.

"Sammy" is the longest song on this album, despite "Don't Need A Man"'s 12:40 track length (most of it is silence; the actual song is a little less than 4:30 long). Clocking in at 6:57, it and the title track from their 1999 follow-up, We Kill Everything, were the longest songs by the band until the song "War on GWAR" (7:21) was released on 2017's The Blood of Gods. Note, the 30th anniversary remix of Scumdogs of the Universe includes the entire version of “King Queen”, which clocks in at 8:09, making it the longest Gwar song to appear on a studio album.

Songs from Carnival have not been in the band's setlists for a number of years except for the group occasionally playing "Penguin Attack" and "Back to Iraq". Unlike We Kill Everything, where the band readily admits their dissatisfaction for the content (explaining the absence of songs from that album), they have yet to give a definitive reason why. The songs "Pre-Skool Prostitute" and "Hate Love Songs" were part of Gwar's 2013 Madness At The Core Of Time Tour setlist.

== Track listing ==
All tracks by Gwar

No.	Title	Length
1.	"Penguin Attack"	3:27
2.	"Let's Blame the Lightman"	3:09
3.	"First Rule Is"	3:24
4.	"Sammy"	6:57
5.	"Endless Apocalypse"	4:58
6.	"Billy Bad Ass"	3:24
7.	"Hate Love Songs" (Vocals by Beefcake the Mighty)	3:02
8.	"Letter From the Scallop Boat"	2:49
9.	"Preskool Prostitute"	5:08
10.	"If I Could Be That"	3:16
11.	"In Her Fear"	3:51
12.	"Back to Iraq"	2:18
13.	"I Suck On My Thumb"	3:06
14.	"The Private Pain of Techno Destructo" (Vocals by Techno Destructo)	5:08
15.	"Gonna Kill U"	2:35
16.	"Sex Cow"	2:58
17.	"Antarctican Drinking Song"	1:38
18.	"Don't Need a Man" (Vocals by Slymenstra Hymen)	12:40

== Personnel ==
- Dave Brockie (Oderus Urungus) – Lead vocals
- Pete Lee (Flattus Maximus) – Lead guitar, backing vocals
- Mike Derks (Balsac the Jaws of Death) – Rhythm guitar, backing vocals
- Casey Orr (Beefcake the Mighty) – Bass, backing vocals, lead vocals on "Hate Love Songs"
- Brad Roberts (Jizmak Da Gusha) – Drums
- Hunter Jackson (Techno Destructo) – Lead vocals on "The Private Pain of Techno Destructo"
- Danielle Stampe (Slymenstra Hymen) – Lead vocals on "Don't Need a Man"
- Ron Goudie – Producer, Mixing
- Warren Croyle – Mixing
- Gene Grimaldi – Mastering
- Katherine Leatherwood – Photography
- Drew Mazurek – Mixing
- Mark Miley – Assistant Engineer, Drum Producer
- Grant Rutledge – Assistant Engineer
- Eddy Schreyer – Mastering
