= War Party (album) =

Studio album by Gwar
- Released: October 26, 2004
- Recorded: 2004
- Genres: Thrash metal, heavy metal
- Length: 38:26
- Label: DRT Entertainment
- Producers: Gwar, Glen Robinson

Gwar chronology
Violence Has Arrived (2001)	War Party (2004)	Live from Mt. Fuji (2005)

Professional ratings
Review scores
Source	Rating
AllMusic	3.5/5 stars
Classic Rock	2/5 stars
Rock Hard	6/10 stars

War Party is the ninth studio album by American heavy metal band Gwar. It was released on October 26, 2004, being the band's first album in DRT Entertainment. In addition, this also marks the first studio album with Corey Smoot as Flattus Maximus and the first of two albums to feature Todd Evans as Beefcake The Mighty. The album was released to positive reviews.

== Overview ==
After Violence Has Arrived, Gwar switched labels from Metal Blade to DRT Entertainment. War Party was released on October 26, 2004, and continues the decidedly heavier focus reintroduced in Violence Has Arrived. War Party is the most political Gwar album since America Must Be Destroyed, tackling such subject matter as the 2004 American election and the war in Iraq in such songs as "Bring Back the Bomb", "Krosstika", "War Party", "The Reaganator" and "You Can't Kill Terror". Dave Brockie said "...basically Gwar pledges support to the powers who support the war, and we make such a right-wing statement that the right wing would be ashamed to have us."

Gwar still has more gratuitous violent imagery in "Womb with a View", "Fistful of Teeth" and "Bonesnapper" and retains some trademark silliness in the Beefcake the Mighty-hollered French punk song "The Bonus Plan". War Party was supported in fall 2004 by the Mock the Vote tour. The enhanced CD portion contains a music video for "Womb with a View", which shows a plethora of concert footage from the band's spring 2004 tour.

Dave Brockie was especially favorable about this album, as it continues with a heavier musical direction for the band. According to interviews with Todd Evans (Beefcake the Mighty) and Brockie, War Party was selling very well, and was attracting new Gwar fans, as well as seeing old ones come back.

== Concept ==
Although not following a true story per se, unlike many of the band's previous albums, there seems to be an ongoing concept throughout the album about a fictional political party named "The War Party", with policies dedicated specifically to the eradication of the human race by supporting global war and hatred, under the "Krosstika", a symbol crossing the Christian cross and the Nazi swastika ("Two great hates that hate great together"). The band refers to the Krosstika on their next studio album, Beyond Hell, and will often play this song towards the beginning of their concerts.

Though the War Party itself has disbanded (according to Gwar lore), the band continues to play songs from this album in concert, as the album is among the band's favorites, most notably the song "Bring Back the Bomb".

== Track listing ==
No.	Title	Length
1.	"Bring Back the Bomb"	4:23
2.	"Krosstika"	3:35
3.	"Womb With a View"	2:26
4.	"Decay of Grandeur" (misprinted on the back as "Decay of Granduer")	4:05
5.	"War Party"	3:16
6.	"Bonesnapper (The Faces of the Slain)"	4:42
7.	"Lost God"	3:58
8.	"The Reaganator"	3:05
9.	"The Bonus Plan" (vocals by Beefcake the Mighty)	1:16
10.	"You Can't Kill Terror"	3:17
11.	"Fistful of Teeth"	3:56

== Personnel ==
- Dave Brockie (Oderus Urungus) – lead vocals
- Cory Smoot (Flattus Maximus) – lead guitar, backing vocals
- Mike Derks (Balsac the Jaws of Death) – rhythm guitar, backing vocals
- Todd Evans (Beefcake the Mighty) – bass guitar, backing vocals, lead vocals on "The Bonus Plan"
- Brad Roberts (Jizmak Da Gusha) – drums, percussion
