= Phallus in Wonderland =

Video by Gwar
- Released: 1992
- Genre: Thrash metal, punk rock
- Length: 60 min
- Label: Metal Blade Records
- Director: Distortion Wells & Judas Bullhorn
- Producer: Dean English

Gwar chronology
Live from Antarctica (1990)	Phallus in Wonderland (1992)	All the Sex (1992)

Professional ratings
Review scores
Source	Rating
Allmusic	3/5 stars

Phallus in Wonderland is a film by American heavy metal band Gwar, their first attempt at a commercially released, long-form film. The video was nominated for a Grammy Award for Best Long Form Music Video in 1993 (which they lost to Annie Lennox for Diva, as mock-mentioned in the 1994 song "Jack the World").

== Plot ==
The film opens with a young Gwar fan on a skateboard, who is shocked to learn of the recent theft of front man Oderus Urungus' "Cuttlefish of Cthulhu" (or penis). The fan is then abducted by Gwar via a giant intercontinental fishing hook, and is taken to Gwar's Antarctic stronghold where they are celebrating the birth of Gor-Gor (Crack in the Egg). Band manager Sleazy P. Martini contacts Gwar, telling them to come to New York City to shoot a commercial for Gwar cereal, a cornflake-like food that is sprinkled with crack cocaine rather than sugar, turning kids into addicts (Have You Seen Me?).

As the Morality Squad prepares for their attack on Gwar, their religious representative, Father Bohab, is convicted of child molestation and sodomy of a twelve-year-old choirboy. Despite the clear evidence of Bohab's crimes, the Squad feel he was framed by Gwar (particularly Sleazy, who took part in exposing him); he is released and the charges are dropped. While Bohab is picketing against Gwar along with other protestors, Gwar and Sleazy brutally attack the crowd, culminating in the disembowelment of Bohab and him being sodomized with his own cross.

Gwar then travel to a nightclub, where they all become wasted on crack (The Road Behind). The next morning, the Cuttlefish of Cthulhu (having escaped the Morality Squad's grasp) reunites with a hungover Oderus, and warns them of the imminent attack by the Morality Squad. Gwar emerge victorious over the Morality Squad (The Morality Squad). Their victory is short-lived; Gor-Gor, having grown to monstrous size, arrives in New York and begins wreaking havoc. Rather than retreat, Gwar battles Gor-Gor in a titanic clash, resulting in the T-Rex's death (Gor-Gor). The final shot of the film reveals the Cuttlefish of Cthulhu happily reunited with Oderus amidst the rubble (Ham on the Bone).

== Home media ==
Phallus in Wonderland was first released on VHS in 1992, with a DVD release in 1999, then fell out of print due to confusion over distribution rights.

Metal Blade Records rereleased the DVD in January 2008, with special features including instant scene access, options to play songs only, and curtain call.

== Director aliases ==
"Distortion Wells" is the pseudonym for Bill Morrison, who later directed the music video to "Saddam a Go-Go". "Judas Bullhorn" is Canadian director and musician Blair Dobson. Despite being nominated for a Grammy, neither were ever paid for months of work on the project, and Dobson, after initiating the project between his company and Slave Pit/Metal Blade, left halfway through shooting.

In the Bohab Central forums, Mike Bishop (who played Beefcake the Mighty at the time) claimed that this use of outside directors led to serious tension between himself (it was his doing) and Hunter Jackson (founder of Slave Pit Inc.), and was a major factor in his departure the following year.

== Cultural references ==
In the news report scene where Gor-Gor is approaching New York City, the exasperated newscaster pulls a gun out of an envelope and commits suicide on live television in a manner parodying that of R. Budd Dwyer.

== Flattus Maximus ==
As with the album America Must Be Destroyed (upon which this film is based), Phallus in Wonderland does not have a distinct Flattus Maximus character. A friend of the band's named "STRETCH" filled the role for the few scenes in which Flattus appears, and is killed in the "Gor-Gor" video.

== Track listing ==
1. "Crack in the Egg"
2. "Have You Seen Me?"
3. "The Road Behind"
4. "The Morality Squad"
5. "Gor-Gor"
6. "Ham on the Bone" (credits)
