= Let There Be Gwar =

Compilation album by Gwar
- Released: 2004
- Recorded: 1986
- Genre: Thrash metal, Hardcore punk
- Length: 38:00
- Label: Slave Pit Records

Gwar chronology
War Party (2004)	Let There Be Gwar (2004)	Beyond Hell (2006)

Let There Be Gwar is a collection of the first ever Gwar demo recordings. It was released in 2004. It was also remastered by Cory Smoot at Karma Studios.

== Track listing ==
No.	Title	Length
1.	"You Ain’t Shit"	1:08
2.	"Americanized"	1:58
3.	"GWAR Theme"	1:35
4.	"Rock ‘N’ Roll Party Town"	3:31
5.	"Pure As The Arctic Snow"	2:16
6.	"Americanized"	1:31
7.	"U Ain’t Shit"	0:58
8.	"Slutman City"	3:56
9.	"Time For Death"	3:07
10.	"GWAR Theme"	1:49
11.	"Rock ‘N’ Roll Party Town"	2:49
12.	"Techno’s Song" (Instrumental)	2:27
13.	"Eat Steel"	2:34
14.	"Gor-Gor"	8:21
Total length:		38:00
