= AMBD =

AMBD may refer to:

- America Must Be Destroyed, album by Gwar
- Monetary Authority of Brunei Darussalam (Malay: Autoriti Monetari Brunei Darussalam), Brunei's central bank
