= Sick of You (Gwar song) =

Song by Gwar

from the album Scumdogs of the Universe
- Released: 1990
- Recorded: 1990
- Genre: Heavy metal
- Length: 3:08
- Label: Metal Blade Records
- Songwriter: Dave Brockie
- Producer: Ron Goudie

"Sick of You" is the third track on American heavy metal band Gwar's second studio album Scumdogs of the Universe.

== Overview ==
"Sick of You" is, lyrically, a simple song, dealing with feelings of utter distaste for a despised one in a somewhat comical fashion:

Your face is gross
You eat white toast
You don't know what to do
And just your luck
You really suck
And so I'm sick of you

Despite the somewhat simple song structure, the song is a fan favorite. Dave Brockie stated it to be his favorite Gwar song (usually because it means the concert is over) and it is the song played most often during the band's live shows.

== Cover ==
The song was covered in 2015 by folk musician Sam Beam under his Iron & Wine pseudonym for The A.V. Club's cover series.
