= America Must Be Destroyed =

- Vinyl cover

Studio album by Gwar
- Released: March 31, 1992
- Recorded: 1991
- Genres: Thrash metal, crossover thrash, comedy metal
- Length: 47:43
- Label: Metal Blade
- Producer: Glen Robinson

Gwar chronology
Scumdogs of the Universe (1990)	America Must Be Destroyed (1992)	This Toilet Earth (1994)

Singles from America Must Be Destroyed
- 1. "The Road Behind" Released: October 6, 1992

Professional ratings
Review scores
Source	Rating
Allmusic	4.5/5 stars
Collector's Guide to Heavy Metal	7/10

America Must Be Destroyed is the third studio album by American heavy metal band Gwar, released in 1992 as their second album on Metal Blade Records. The album’s lyrical content was inspired by controversy over obscenity charges against the band and an incident in Charlotte, North Carolina, in which frontman Dave Brockie’s prosthetic penile attachment, "The Cuttlefish of Cthulhu", was confiscated by police officers.

Loudwire listed it as one of the greatest releases on Metal Blade Records.

== Overview ==
The lyrical content in America Must Be Destroyed was greatly inspired by Dave Brockie's fight with police officers while touring in Charlotte, North Carolina, in 1990. The controversy revolved around Brockie's rubbery penis adornment and ended with his arrest on charges of disseminating obscenity. Brockie was revolted by this attack on his rights so he created a concept album revolving around an elite "Morality Squad" that attacked the members of Gwar and stole Oderus's penile attachment (a.k.a. Cuttlefish of Cthulu, a phallic hell beast that normally dangles from his crotch). The opening song, "Ham on the Bone" (which has a nod to grindcore), explains this robbery. The story then shifts to Gwar headquarters in Antarctica, where Oderus’s slaves are ordered to shoot up a dinosaur egg with crack. The result is the mighty Gor Gor, a Tyrannosaurus Rex that wreaks havoc on America. Meanwhile, the Morality Squad has enlisted the help of Father Bohab (a Catholic priest) to crucify Gwar in the media. Other songs of interest include "Have You Seen Me?", "Poor Ole Tom", and "The Road Behind", the latter of which is a parody of power ballads. A video, Phallus in Wonderland, was released as a supplement to the album's storyline. This album was followed by The Road Behind, an EP that contained that single as well as a live version of "Have You Seen Me?". The single "S.F.W." (a staple of their live shows) was supposedly released on this EP as a bonus track, but this has been discounted by the band.

In November 2009, a special edition of the album was released through Metal Blade, containing the CD and a bonus DVD containing Phallus in Wonderland and Tour De Scum.

Gwar fans are referred to as "bohabs", named for Father Bohab. "Bohab" literally means "habitually boring", which is the opposite of what Gwar and their fans are. It fits Father Bohab perfectly; Gwar speaks ill of their fans—‌to their delight—‌and they have since taken the term as a point of pride.

Father Bohab was never actually on the album—‌he originally appeared in 1989, along with an early Cardinal Syn. On the Tour de Scum (the corresponding tour to Scumdogs of the Universe), the Morality Squad story is introduced. Bohab is played by one of the slaves on tour (according to Chuck Varga’s Bohab Central forum posts, it was Bob Gorman; he also went on to say that the voice was his), but is portrayed by Brad Roberts (Jizmak Da Gusha) in Phallus in Wonderland and It's Sleazy.

"Pussy Planet", the album's closer, was co-written by Slymenstra Hymen, and was slated to be a duet with Beefcake the Mighty. Though not quite a duet, Slymenstra's voice can still be heard in the song. The song's opening bass riff is similar to the guitar riff to the Nirvana song "Rape Me" from the 1993 album In Utero ("Rape Me" was originally written in early 1991 pre-dating "Pussy Planet", with the demo version being released many years later on Nirvana's With the Lights Out box set) but uses different chords. The song ends with the band arguing.

The Canadian release of this album does not feature "Crack in the Egg", "Have You Seen Me?" and "Rock N' Roll Never Felt So Good", and instead has earlier versions of "Krak Down" and "Bad Bad Men" (both from This Toilet Earth) and a version of "O Canada" performed with synthesized infant cries (according to Gwar, this was included as a way to ridicule Canada for not having the "guts" to include the omitted songs).

Flattus Maximus does not perform on this album. Dewey Rowell left the band before recording began, and all of the lead guitars (save for two songs —‌"Crack in the Egg" and the title track) were recorded by Balsac the Jaws of Death. To this day, Balsac will usually play lead when performing songs from this album live. Tim Harriss (of Kepone, the band Michael Bishop left Gwar for) played lead on the album's title track; Lee Harris (from Jizmak Da Gusha’s old band Rosebud) played lead on "Crack in the Egg". Because of the absence of Flattus, the tour cycle surrounding this album was quite short.

== Track listing ==
No.	Title	Writer(s)	Length
1.	"Ham on the Bone"	Dave Brockie	2:04
2.	"Crack in the Egg"	Brockie, Dewey Rowell	3:37
3.	"Gor-Gor"	Brockie, Mike Bishop, Mike Derks	4:21
4.	"Have You Seen Me?"	Brockie, Bishop	4:46
5.	"The Morality Squad" (Vocals by Edna P. Granbo)	Hunter Jackson, Bishop	3:37
6.	"America Must Be Destroyed" (Instrumental with vocal samples)	Brockie, Dave Musel, Bishop, Derks	4:45
7.	"Gilded Lily"	Brockie, Bishop, Derks	3:36
8.	"Poor Ole Tom"	Brockie, Bishop	5:07
9.	"Rock N Roll Never Felt So Good"	Bishop	4:17
10.	"Blimey"	Brockie, Bishop, Derks	3:12
11.	"The Road Behind" (Vocals by Oderus Urungus and Beefcake the Mighty)	Brockie, Bishop	5:30
12.	"Pussy Planet" (Vocals by Beefcake the Mighty and Slymenstra Hymen)	Danielle Stampe, Bishop, Derks	2:51

Canadian Edition
No.	Title	Writer(s)	Length
1.	"Ham on the Bone"	Dave Brockie	2:04
2.	"Gor-Gor"	Brockie, Mike Bishop, Mike Derks	4:21
3.	"The Morality Squad" (Vocals by Edna P. Granbo)	Hunter Jackson, Bishop	3:37
4.	"America Must Be Destroyed" (Instrumental with vocal samples)	Brockie, Dave Musel, Bishop, Derks	4:45
5.	"Krak Down" (Studio demo)	Brockie, Bishop, Derks	3:56
6.	"Gilded Lily"	Brockie, Bishop, Derks	3:36
7.	"Poor Ole Tom"	Brockie, Bishop	5:07
8.	"Blimey"	Brockie, Bishop, Derks	3:12
9.	"The Road Behind" (Vocals by Oderus Urungus and Beefcake the Mighty)	Brockie, Bishop	5:30
10.	"Pussy Planet" (Vocals by Beefcake the Mighty and Slymenstra Hymen)	Danielle Stampe, Bishop, Derks	2:51
11.	"Bad Bad Men (Of The Wild Wild West)" (Studio demo)	Brockie, Bishop, Derks	3:20
12.	"Oh Canada" (Instrumental created with a crying baby sample)	Calixa Lavallée	1:09

== Personnel ==
- Dave Brockie (Oderus Urungus) – Lead vocals
- Mike Derks (Balsac the Jaws of Death) – Lead guitar, Rhythm guitar, backing vocals
- Michael Bishop (Beefcake the Mighty) – Bass, backing vocals; lead vocals on "Pussy Planet" and "The Road Behind"
- Brad Roberts (Jizmak Da Gusha) – Drums
- Danielle Stampe (Slymenstra Hymen) – Backing vocals
- Chuck Varga (Sexecutioner) – Spoken words at the end of "Pussy Planet"
- Hunter Jackson (Edna P. Granbo) – Vocals on "The Morality Squad"
- Dave Musel (Müsel) – Samples on "America Must Be Destroyed"

== See also ==
- Phallus in Wonderland
- The Road Behind
