= This Toilet Earth =

Studio album by Gwar
- Released: March 29, 1994
- Recorded: 1993
- Genres: Heavy metal; crossover thrash; comedy rock; alternative metal
- Length: 40:59
- Labels: Priority Records (First Pressing), Metal Blade Records (All subsequent pressings)
- Producer: Scott Wolfe

Gwar chronology
America Must Be Destroyed (1992)	This Toilet Earth (1994)	Ragnarök (1995)

Professional ratings
Review scores
Source	Rating
Allmusic	2/5 stars
Collector's Guide to Heavy Metal	7/10

This Toilet Earth is the fourth studio album by American heavy metal band Gwar. Released on March 29, 1994, this album was to be one of their oddest and most bittersweet albums. It was the first Gwar album to be censored (the second was We Kill Everything, which comes in both censored and uncensored versions), due to their gain in popularity as a result of MTV exposure. The music and artwork is almost cartoonish when compared to the previous albums, and the instrumentation had expanded to include horns (in the opener, "Saddam a Go-Go") that reinforce the goofiness. An instrumental version of the song "Jack the World" was also featured in the Beavis and Butt-Head video game for the Sega Genesis and Super Nintendo Entertainment System.

== Skulhedface ==
Skulhedface was a movie released to coincide with this album. Within the storyline, the enemy is now Skulhedface, an alien queen who was deformed in a Synnite Warrior raid on her planet centuries before. In retaliation, she travels to Antarctica, encounters Gwar while they are hibernating, and steals their Jizmoglobin, or life force. Her midget slave Flopsy and she then create a creature made up of the melded parts of evil historical figures (such as Hitler) called the Flesh Column. Skulhedface disguises herself as an evil executive for the Glomco corporation, and uses propaganda to turn Gwar into sickeningly cuddly cartoon characters. Meanwhile, Gwar discovers that the World Maggot is their only opportunity to escape Earth, but Skullhedface stands in their way. Gwar must regain their Jizmoglobin and catch the maggot in time. Both the movie Skulhedface and the album feature the voice of Scott Krahl as Skulhedface (Krahl played Gor-Gor in the tour prior to this album). Krahl also played the World Maggot on this tour and movie.

== "B.D.F." ==
In late 1992/early 1993, during the band's search to find a bigger record label and distributor, Warner Bros. Records took note of Gwar's seemingly increasing success and offered them the deal they were looking for. Not only would Gwar, as well as the entire Metal Blade Records catalogue, get a great distribution deal, but the record company was also willing to help them get their next movie, Skulhedface, a bigger budget, as well as a planned theatrical release. Excited to get their first taste of real mainstream success with Gwar, the band immediately began work on both the album and the movie, with both being finished in late 1993. However, Warner Bros. wasn't happy with the end product of This Toilet Earth, mainly because of one song: "B.D.F.". They told the band if they omitted the song, the issue would be resolved and everything would continue as planned; but if the band refused to drop the song, not only would the entire record be dropped and Gwar's contract ripped up, but the distribution plans between Metal Blade and Warner Bros. would no longer continue as well. The band had serious internal discussions whether or not to drop "B.D.F.", and they all concluded they would not leave the song off. After hearing that Metal Blade Records was fully supportive of the band's decision, Gwar reported back to Warner Bros. and told them no, "B.D.F" was there to stay. Gwar now had a new album and a new movie, but no distributor.

Because of B.D.F.'s comically vulgar and extremely graphic references to obscene acts that run the gamut from sodomy, necrophilia, pre-natal rape, pedophilia to mutilation (the initials stand for "Baby Dick Fuck," which is used in the chorus of the song), Gwar was forced to release the initial pressing of the CD through Priority Records - this initial pressing was 25,000 copies, according to Brad Roberts. The song was removed from subsequent pressings of the CD through Metal Blade Records. "B.D.F." was not the only song to cover such subject matter - We Kill Everything's "Babyraper," with its less-than-subtle title (as opposed to the abbreviation used for "B.D.F"), goes into extreme detail about the same subject, but, unlike in 1994, was not required to be removed from the album (presumably because it was released at the lowest point of Gwar's popularity). Both songs are still played live, though less frequently than other, heavier songs (indeed, very few of the tracks on either album are played live, due largely to story conflicts and new musical direction).

== Lineup changes ==
This Toilet Earth is Gwar's first album with Peter Lee as Flattus Maximus. Lee would be shot not too long after the album was finished. As a result, he was out of commission for the beginning of the tour, and most of Skulhedface's filming. As a result, touring for this album was minimal.

It is also the last album with Michael Bishop as Beefcake the Mighty as an actual full-time member of the band. Bishop left the band in 1993, after the recording of This Toilet Earth. He was replaced by Casey Orr, and then would return for the brief touring preceding, and the recording of, We Kill Everything. Bishop then returned after the death of Dave Brockie in 2014, as Blothar.

== Track listing ==
No.	Title	Writer(s)	Length
1.	"Saddam a Go-Go"	Dave Brockie, Mike Bishop, Mike Derks	2:30
2.	"Penis I See"	Brockie, Bishop, Derks	2:55
3.	"Eat Steel" (Vocals by Beefcake the Mighty)	Bishop, Brockie	1:28
4.	"Jack the World"	Brockie, Bishop, Derks	2:24
5.	"SounderKommando"	Brockie, Bishop, Derks	4:54
6.	"Bad Bad Men"	Brockie, Bishop, Derks	3:08
7.	"Pepperoni"	Brockie, Bishop, Derks	1:41
8.	"The Insidious Soliloquy of Skulhedface" (Vocals by Skulhedface)	Scott Krahl, Bishop, Derks	5:16
9.	"B.D.F."	Brockie, Bishop, Derks	2:23
10.	"Fight" (Vocals by Beefcake the Mighty)	Brockie, Bishop	0:56
11.	"The Issue of Tissue (Spacecake)"	Brockie, Bishop, Pete Lee	3:11
12.	"Pocketpool"	Brockie, Bishop, Derks	2:27
13.	"Slap U Around"	Brockie, Jim Thompson, Derks	2:39
14.	"Krak Down"	Brockie, Derks, Bishop	3:22
15.	"Filthy Flow"	Brockie, Bishop, Derks, Lee	2:14
16.	"The Obliteration of Flab Quarv 7"	Brockie, Bishop, Derks, Lee	2:42

Note

- The track listing on the back of the album skips the number 9, making the album appear to have only 15 tracks. The track listing on the disc itself corrects this matter.

== Personnel ==
- Dave Brockie (Oderus Urungus) - lead vocals, bass on "Eat Steel" and "Fight"
- Pete Lee (Flattus Maximus) - lead guitar, backing vocals
- Mike Derks (Balsac the Jaws of Death) - rhythm guitar, backing vocals, spoken words on "Obliteration of Flab Quarv 7"
- Michael Bishop (Beefcake the Mighty) - bass, backing vocals, lead vocals on "Eat Steel" and "Fight"
- Brad Roberts (Jizmak Da Gusha) - drums
- Danielle Stampe (Slymenstra Hymen) - backing vocals
- Scott Krahl (Skulhedface) - vocals on "The Insidious Soliloquy of Skulhed Face"
