= Slave Pit Inc. =

Slave Pit Records
- Genre: Rock
- Country of origin: United States
- Location: Richmond, Virginia
- Official website: slavepitinc.com

Slave Pit Inc. is the artist collective, production company and independent record label created for releasing projects by the heavy metal band Gwar and related side projects such as Mensrea and Locus Factor.

According to a 2015 TED Talk by Michael Bishop, an early member of Gwar now trained in music ethnography, the name is a commentary on the privilege of the band's white members within Richmond, Virginia's history of racial slavery.

== History (1984–1993) ==
1984

- Hunter Jackson rents a studio in an old Richmond Dairy building, intending to shoot a space pirate movie entitled "Scumdogs of the Universe". He names his studio "The Slave Pit".

1985

- Two costumes are completed and Death Piggy moves to the Dairy building.
- Mike Delaney moves into the Dairy building and names his studio "The Swamp".
- Chuck Varga moves to Richmond and moves in with Delaney.

1986

- Don Drakulich rents studio space in the Dairy building and ultimately moves in.
- Many new artists and bands move into the Dairy building.
- Slave Pit, The Swamp, and Don's studio begin prop production for Gwar performances.

1987

- Renovations to the Dairy building force many tenants out and prop production moves to a tobacco warehouse a few miles away.
- Slave Pit is soon kicked out of the tobacco warehouse and returns to Don's cramped Dairy space.
- The artists solidify from a loose collaboration to real members of Gwar; consisting of Don Drakulich, Chuck Varga, Mike Bonner, Scott Krahl, Dave Musel, and Dave Brockie.
- In October, 801 W. Broad St. is rented as a new Slave Pit.

1988

- In October, the first complete North American tour coast to coast.

1989

- The North American tour aptly named Death Tour 89 begins.

1990

- Slave Pit Incorporated becomes a legal corporation.
- In April, Scumdogs of the Universe is recorded, and released in July.
- In September, North American Tour De Scum 90.

1991

- In September, Slave Pit Inc. moves to 2010 Chamberlayne Ave.
- In October Phallus in Wonderland filmed.

1992

- In February, Phallus in Wonderland released.

1993

- First Gwar-B-Que at the Slave Pit.

== Artist roster ==
- Gwar
- Death Piggy
- Mensrea
- Locus Factor
- X-Cops
- Dave Brockie Experience

== See also ==
- DRT Entertainment
- Shimmy Disc
- Metal Blade Records
- List of record labels
