= D8 (magazine) =

Role-playing game magazine

d8 was a magazine that was published out of Philadelphia and New York City in 1995-1996 and targeted fans of role-playing games. The name referred to an eight-sided polyhedral die common in such games.

Unlike other gaming magazines, d8’s focus was not on gaming systems and rules, but rather the art of role playing and the cultural, pop-cultural, and subcultural interests of the people who played games. d8 styled itself “the magazine of role-playing culture”. This editorial mission was conceived of by Founder and Creative Director David DeCheser. The magazine was financed by Frank Slattery IV, an avid gamer who wanted to be involved in the field.

== Contributors ==
Edited by Holly Black and Joe Cirillo, the magazine had a host of eclectic and regular contributors that included author Steve Berman, Gwar member Hunter Jackson, illustrators Joseph Hasenauer and Theo Black, Yamara creators Barbara Manui and Chris Adams, and former Shadis editor Jolly R. Blackburn.

Articles on LARPs were placed side-by-side with interviews with comic book artists such as Dave McKean, reviews of authentic medieval restaurants, and caffeinated tips on how to game all night. One of d8’s stand-out regular features was its fashion spread which, coordinated by stylist Deanna Stull and photographed by Director of Photography Michael Amper, showcased shoots that included renaissance garb, neo-gothic vampires in latex, and leather plated armor.

The magazine is credited as introducing Holly Black to artist Tony DiTerlizzi, who would later go on to co-author The Spiderwick Chronicles. Black’s first published work, "Ahremon/City of the Sun: Garden of Ghosts", appeared in the second issue of d8. At that time she was writing under the name Holly Riggenbach.

== Art direction and graphic style ==
The magazine was both highly praised and criticized for its graphic design. The design was very influenced by then-famous Ray Gun designer David Carson, and the “grunge” style typefaces being produced by font foundries such as T26. Critics cited the grid-less expressive design as difficult to read. Conversely the design is what attracted the less traditional, more alternative artistic contributors that Creative Director David DeCheser sought, such as: Dave McKean, Eric Dinyer, and John K. Snyder III.

== Public Relations & Marketing ==
Managed internally by Deanna Stull, internal advertisements for subscriptions and a marketing style suited the industry.

Launched at a time when collectible card games such as Magic: The Gathering were infiltrating the gaming market, d8’s audience proved to be too niche to continue past its fourteen-month run. It was successful however in attracting a cross-over audience of fans of gothic subculture.
