= Sexecutioner =

Character in the heavy metal band Gwar

Sexecutioner was a supporting character in the heavy metal band Gwar, played originally by Mike Delaney, and finally by Chuck Varga from 1989 until 1996, with special appearances in 2000 (the You're All Worthless and Weak concert), 2012, and 2014. He sang lead on his trademark songs, "Sexecutioner", and "Ragnarok".

There are conflicting origin stories of the Sexecutioner - the Slave Pit Funnies (from 1989–1990) suggest that he was summoned in an ancient ritual by Oderus, and was raised from infancy to become Scumdog material. The song "Sexecutioner" bluntly states that he is from France (hence the French accent), though possibly as a joke. Earlier incarnations of Gwar's website (pre-dating 2004, when the website underwent a drastic overhaul) state that he was from the planet Eros, in the Genital V System, and that even he doesn't know his own age.

During his time with the band his stage role was similar to that of a slave, in that he assisted Oderus Urungus in fighting the band's enemies. Unlike the slaves, he was treated as a member of the band (with a similar role as Slymenstra Hymen).

Varga, after designing the most frequently seen Sexecutioner mask (the first full head mask for the band), worked with Dave Brockie on Oderus' mask, which has remained largely unchanged since its inception in late 1989.

Varga retired from touring in 1995 (Varga was the oldest member of Slave Pit Inc., and touring became physically stressful, especially on his knees), but worked part-time until 2001. Following his departure, he co-founded Hypereal Productions with Don Drakulich (Sleazy P. Martini), who had also retired from touring.

According to Drakulich, the term "bohab" was, in part, invented by Varga - initially, it was a nickname for a socially inept friend of Hunter Jackson's (named Bob), invented by Dave Musel; after hearing him say this (he was in the room when this happened), "He instantly shortened it by getting rid of the Slohab then coined as part of the Slave-Pit lexicon to refer to anyone who is socially awkward, who drones on about trivial matters while boring all those around him. In particular it refers to those who are tedious talkers who refuse to let bored body language and avoidance by others stop their persistently friendly overtures - now known as bohabery. Bohabs are not losers who chose to be loners. Bohabs are losers who are persistently friendly."

According to Gwar's website, The Sexecutioner was to return for the 2012 Gwar B-Q. It was unknown if this marked a permanent return of the character, or if he would be portrayed by Varga. The Sexecutioner did appear at the fifth Gwar B-Q after the death of Dave Brockie, taking vocals of one song, "Sexecutioner". Varga's death was announced on September 25, 2026, aged 68.
