= Mike Derks (musician) =

American guitarist

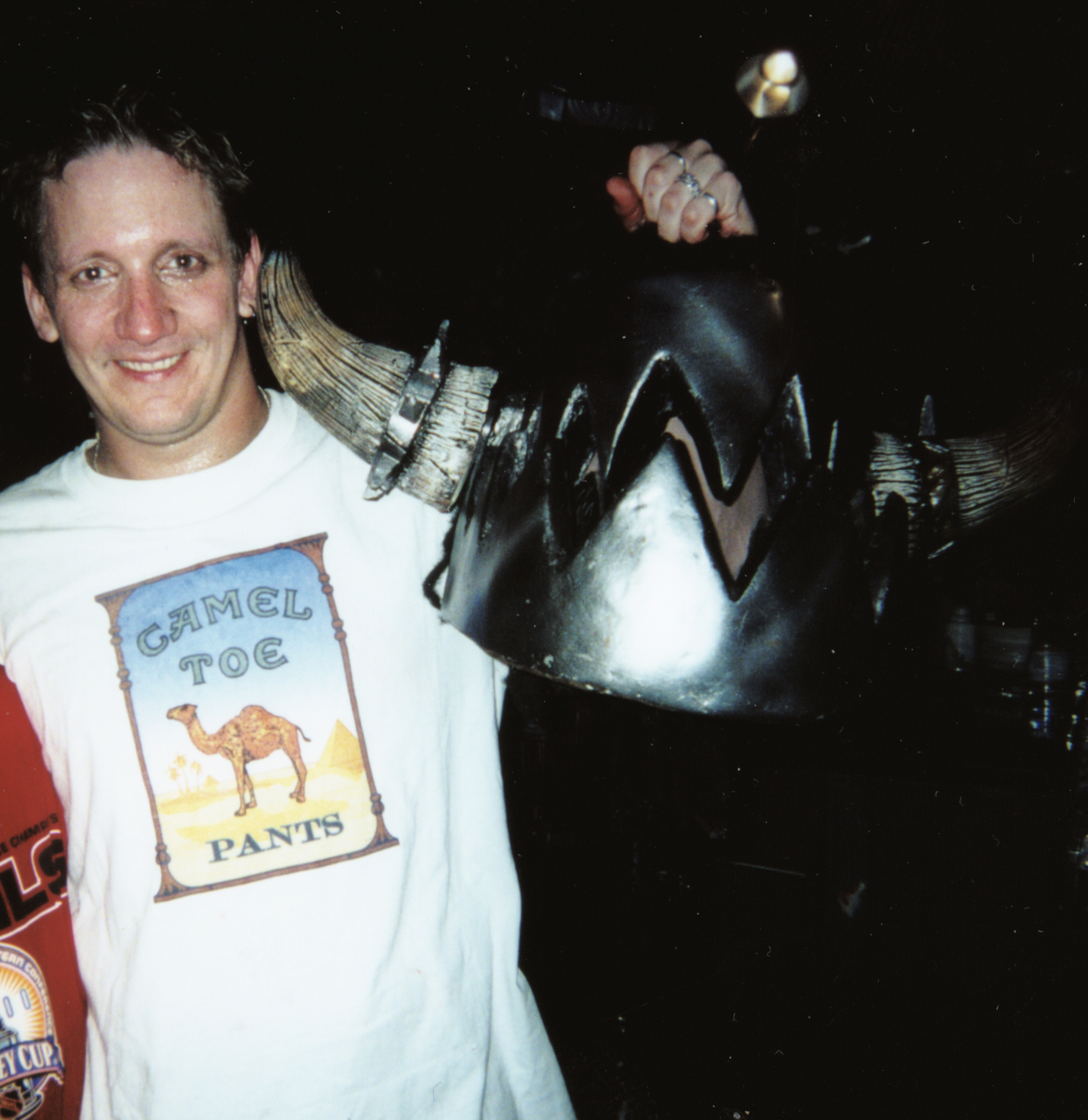
- Mike Derks, out of costume, holding the Balsac head in 2002

Background information
- Also known as: Balsac the Jaws of Death
- Born: June 28, 1968 (age 58)
- Genres: Crossover thrash; hardcore punk; shock rock
- Occupation: Guitarist
- Years active: 1985–present
- Labels: Metal Blade Records; DRT Entertainment; Slave Pit Inc.
- Member of: Gwar; X-Cops
- Formerly of: Dave Brockie Experience
- Website: Gwar official site

Mike Derks (born June 28, 1968; also known by his stage name Balsac the Jaws of Death, stylized BälSäc the Jaws ‘o Death) is an American guitarist, best known as the rhythm guitarist in the American heavy metal band Gwar since 1988. On stage he appears as a humanoid creature with a face resembling a bear-trap, usually portrayed wielding an enormous battleaxe.

== History ==
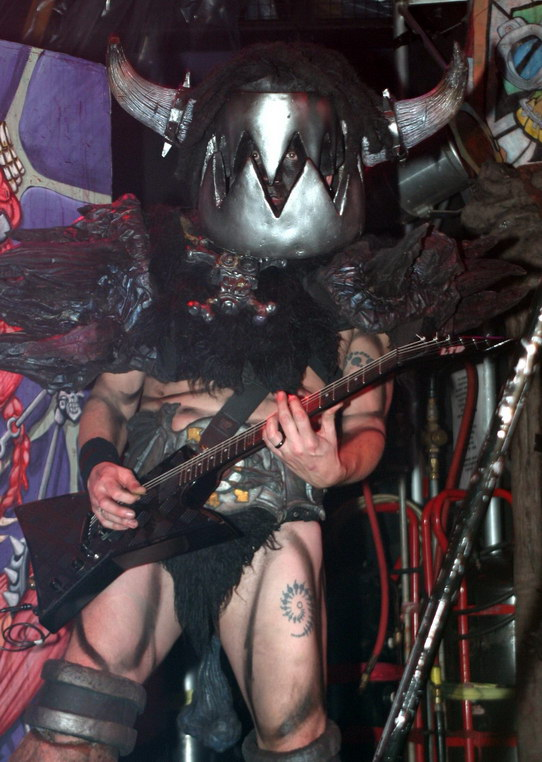
Balsac the Jaws of Death live on Stage in Edmonton in 2004.

Before Derks joined the group in 1988, the original 1985 Gwar lineup featured two separate characters Jaws of Death and BalSac. Jaws of Death played by guitarist Steve Douglas (of Death Piggy), who wore a crude version of the familiar animal trap face, and BalSac (1985-1987) played by bassist Chris Bopst, who wore a simple open-face piece of spiked headgear. Douglas returned to the band as Balsac the Jaws of Death for the recording of Gwar's first album Hell-O. He was replaced by Derks shortly after.

Derks has occasionally been featured as a vocalist, his vocals can be heard on the songs "Obliteration of Flab Quarv 7", from This Toilet Earth, and "Mary Anne" from We Kill Everything. Derks' first Gwar song was "Black and Huge", and the first song featuring him on vocals was "The Needle", which was later re-recorded as "Escape From The Mooselodge" on We Kill Everything, featuring Oderus Urungus on vocals. "Black and Huge" was originally recorded after Hell-O was released in the United States.

Except for a few gigs in Europe in 1991 where Balsac was played by Barry "D'live" Ward of RKL, Derks has played the character ever since. Derks also runs the Gwar mailing list and has performed in Gwar spin-off bands X-Cops, Rawg, and the Dave Brockie Experience.

A large portion of Gwar's catalog was written (or co-written) by Derks, who has also contributed to the production of several songs.

Slave Pit, Inc. claims Derks joined the band in 1988, making him the longest-serving member of Gwar, following the death of Dave Brockie in 2014.

When asked how exactly he walks in his awkwardly shaped boots, Derks replied, "It's hard, man." The boots in question are actually an optical illusion, with Balsac's legs and feet going straight down, but the way the boots are made make it look as if his legs are bent backwards like a horse's leg.

In 2012, he, alongside his Gwar bandmates, joined the 11th Annual Independent Music Awards judging panel to assist independent musicians' careers.

In 2017, Derks was diagnosed with myelofibrosis.

== Guitars used ==
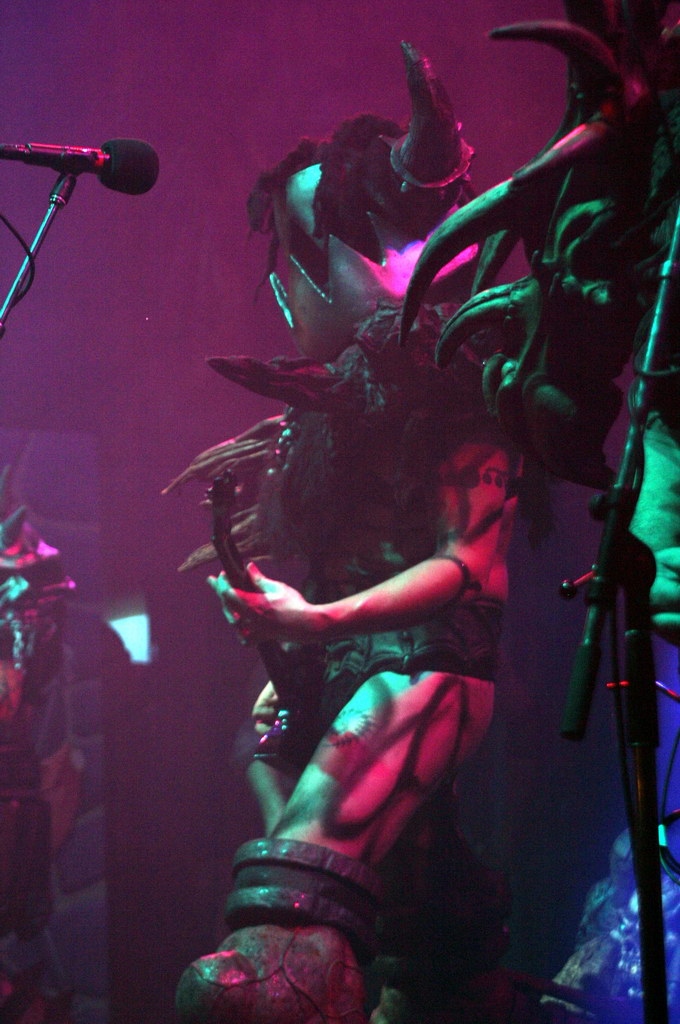
Mike Derks as Balsac the Jaws of Death live on stage in 2004

Derks currently plays Schecter Guitars through a Fractal Audio Axe-Fx III. For a time, he played guitars that were similar in shape to the Gibson Explorer (for a brief time, he actually played one) - most photographs are seen of him playing ESP's equivalent. Before his Schecter endorsement, he played a custom signature variant of the ESP EX series, which featured a single EMG 81 bridge pickup and a custom Balsac graphic.

In the video to "Immortal Corrupter", he is seen playing a yellow-to-black Washburn Dimebag Darrell 333 guitar with red lightning bolts. Only two people had this paint job - Derks and Dimebag Darrell himself. Derks's guitar was stolen after the August 16, 2002 Dave Brockie eXperience concert which was recovered and given back to him by a fan in 2010. He owned a Steinberger P-series guitar, an instrument he seemed to like, though few of his fans thought it wasn't a real guitar. It was sold on eBay in 2005. He played Fernandes guitars for a time in 1997–1999.

In 2012, Schecter announced two signature models to be released in the year. It is based on a design made by ex-Nevermore guitarist Jeff Loomis. One model will feature a single Seymour Duncan Blackout Phase 2 pickup with a Tune-O-Matic bridge, along with a custom Balsac graphic where the neck pickup would be, and the 2nd model would feature 2 Fishman Fluence pickups and a Floyd Rose tremolo system, while being devoid of the Balsac graphic. Both guitars will have a single Balsac inlay on the 3rd fret.

He has played through Fatboy, Crate, Marshall, Krank, and Mesa Boogie amplifiers in the past. He claims he has been using Mesa/Boogie gear for over 20 years, using a Simulclass 295 Stereo power amp since 1989 and a TriAxis preamp since they were first released.
