= Dave Brockie =

Canadian-American musician (1963–2014)

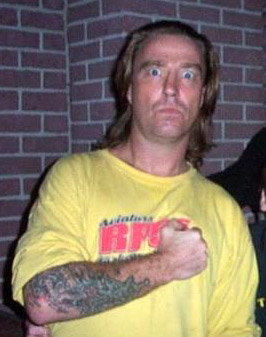

Background information
- Born: David Murray Brockie; August 30, 1963; Ottawa, Ontario, Canada
- Died: March 23, 2014 (aged 50) Richmond, Virginia, U.S.
- Genres: Thrash metal; hardcore punk; punk rock; shock rock; heavy metal; comedy rock
- Occupations: Singer; musician; author; painter; actor
- Instruments: Vocals; guitar; bass guitar
- Years active: 1982–2014
- Labels: Metal Blade Records; DRT Entertainment; Slave Pit Inc.
- Formerly of: Gwar; Dave Brockie Experience; X-Cops; Death Piggy
- Website: Gwar official site Oderus Urungus' official homepage

David Murray Brockie (August 30, 1963 – March 23, 2014) was a Canadian-born American singer and musician. He was the lead vocalist of the heavy metal band Gwar, in which he performed as Oderus Urungus, and he was a bassist and lead singer in the bands Death Piggy, X-Cops, and the Dave Brockie Experience (DBX). He additionally played the Oderus Urungus character in the comedy horror TV sitcom Holliston. Brockie died of a heroin overdose in 2014.

== Early life ==
David Brockie was the younger of two adopted sons of William and Marion Brockie, both of whom were originally from the United Kingdom. David's older brother, Andrew, died from complications of AIDS in the early 1990s. While born in Canada, at age 3 his parents emigrated to the United States. David grew up in Fairfax, Virginia.

He attended Oak View Elementary School and graduated from James W. Robinson Secondary High School in 1981. David's interest in playing music began in high school. David was a huge fan of Monty Python's Flying Circus and frequently impersonated their skits with friends. He possessed a vivid imagination and was very creative throughout his youth, contributing comics and artwork in 1983 to Nihil Obstat, a Richmond, Virginia-based fanzine.

== Oderus Urungus ==
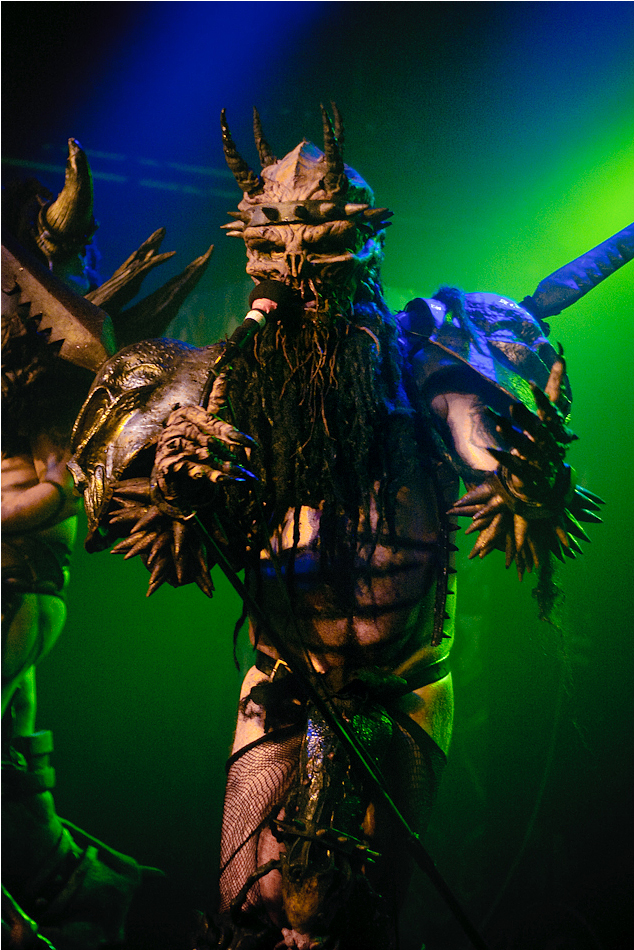
Brockie in character as Oderus Urungus in 2010

Brockie portrayed Oderus Urungus, Gwar's lead singer, from Gwar's inception in 1984 until his death. Oderus appeared as an intergalactic humanoid barbarian with devil horns and a meaty-looking face, and carried a long sword named "Unt Lick" and a cuttlefish around his loins.

=== Backstory ===
According to the character's backstory, Oderus Urungus is 50 billion years old, and was assembled on a planet called Scumdogia in "Syntho Womb 5" after pieces of his moldy war frame were found scattered throughout the galaxy. His only true companion was his cuttlefish, though lost for a short period it returned to its true resting place, strategically placed over his loins.

According to interviews, Oderus's father was a supercomputer, and his mother was a petri dish. During a reading of Goodnight Moon, Oderus revealed that he was born into a gladiatorial arena, during which time he was given a sword, and battled an onslaught of "slowtards" who were trying to rape him. It is suggested in the lyrics of "Fire in the Loins" (from RagNaRok) that Slymenstra Hymen is his sister, but this is never fully explained.

=== History ===
Oderus Urungus was the only character to have existed throughout every incarnation of Gwar until his death, having started as a guitarist, then moving to bass, and finally lead vocals.

Like all of Gwar's characters, Oderus underwent several design changes since his inception. He first started out as a relatively normal-looking character with a papier-mâché helmet with spikes that appeared to be made out of aluminum foil. This eventually progressed into a rubber wig. In the late 1980s Brockie, along with Chuck Varga, created the now-famous original design mask.

After Hell-O!, he added large shoulder pads. These remained relatively unchanged (except for materials used) until 1994, when Brockie experimented with a new style - the left arm resembled a very mutated tentacle. The change did not last, and by the year's end, the design returned to the World War I-era German helmet-shaped shoulder pads. This version can be found in the "Saddam A Go-Go" video from the "Rendezvous With RagNaRok" movie.

In 2001, after the filming of "It's Sleazy", Brockie redesigned the shoulder pads to feature two skulls with longer, more blade-shaped points. The disfigured face remained relatively unchanged since 1988, with slight additions made in 2001 (the redesign of Oderus was in collaboration with the medieval violence-themed Violence Has Arrived album, released in November of that year) – two horns, roughly six or seven inches (150 or 180 mm) in length.

For the Beyond Hell album and tours both preceding and succeeding said album, Oderus's mask was once again redesigned. It appeared more decayed and distorted than the previous masks, and there was exposed flesh on the forehead and the mask had a lighter color to it. The beard was fuller and larger and had red and green highlights in it. The most recent Oderus mask had longer horns and cheek bones that stood out more.

As the front man for the band, Dave Brockie was the most interviewed among the group, alternating between himself and Oderus Urungus. All of Gwar's major television appearances included Dave portraying Oderus.

Oderus appeared semi-regularly on the late-night Fox News talk show Red Eye w/Greg Gutfeld as the Intergalactic Correspondent from July 8, 2009, to September 30, 2010.

==== Holliston ====
On April 3, 2012, the television sitcom Holliston had its world television premiere on the FEARnet cable television network. Created by horror filmmaker Adam Green (Hatchet, Frozen), the series starred Dave Brockie in his "Oderus Urungus" character as series lead Adam Green's imaginary alien friend and guardian angel who lives in his closet. In each episode, whenever "Adam" faced a personal problem, "Oderus" would come out of his closet and dish out advice that was both hilariously and terribly misguided, oftentimes causing "Adam" to have even worse problems.

A second season was green-lit the morning after the second episode had aired. The second season of Holliston began airing on television on June 4, 2012. Brockie toured and appeared with his castmates as "Oderus Urungus" at many live performances of Holliston across the United States in 2012 and 2013. Green appeared on stage with Gwar several times when the band had him introduce their encore performance. The full Holliston cast was murdered on stage and fed to both Gwar's world maggot and meat grinder at several US shows.

A third season of Holliston was being scripted by Green when Brockie died in March 2014. When asked in interviews about how he would address the loss of Brockie and whether or not Holliston would indeed continue, Green stated, "I am too heartbroken over the loss of my friend and brother to think about that right now." Green says he will be focusing on his other upcoming film projects until he is emotionally ready to turn his attention back to his TV series and that "it will take me however long it may take me."

Green joined Jello Biafra and Randy Blythe on stage as one of the speakers at Brockie's public memorial in Richmond, Virginia in August 2014 where he delivered a 15-minute eulogy to the crowd and posted a public eulogy in his blog on www.ariescope.com that included the full audio of Brockie's final voice mail to him. In the voice mail message, Brockie calls Green from Gwar's tour in Australia simply to say, "I miss my Holliston family and I love you… like a little motherfucking little brother. I love you very much."

In 2012, he joined the 11th annual Independent Music Awards judging panel to assist independent musicians' careers.

== 1990 arrest for obscenity ==
In 1990, Brockie was arrested by police for obscenity after a performance in Charlotte, North Carolina. Brockie later recalled how the venue owners asked Gwar to “tone things down [...] but of course we ignored them" as the band delights in provocative behavior. Police took his elaborate codpiece, called the "Cuttlefish of Cthulhu", as evidence. Brockie was, at the time, a Canadian citizen at risk of being deported. In the end, Brockie took a plea bargain and was not deported, but he was banned from North Carolina for a year.

The arrest was written into the Oderus Urungus mythology. Oderus attracts trouble wherever he goes, including one instance where, according to the storyline of Gwar's America Must Be Destroyed album and Phallus in Wonderland movie, Corporal Punishment of The Morality Squad ambushes and detaches the Cuttlefish. This is detailed in the song "Ham On The Bone" (although the song predates the event in question by more than a year, it fits the context of the story perfectly).

Since that incident, Oderus had made it a point to appear with the Cuttlefish whenever possible. Though some tours downplayed the "fish", Gwar's more recent tours had utilized a re-designed Cuttlefish as a means to spray the audience with various fluids.

== Instruments ==
Though he was the lead vocalist of Gwar, Dave Brockie played other instruments with the band. His original position was as one of the (three) guitarists, though other Slave Pit members (as well as Brockie himself) claimed that he was a very poor guitarist. Don Drakulich, a.k.a. Sleazy P. Martini, has given a similar answer in the "Ask Sleazy" section of Bohab Central (a Gwar fansite), even going so far as to say that all of Brockie's guitar parts on Let There Be Gwar were removed.

As a bass player, however, Brockie fared much better. In the Live From Antarctica concert video, Oderus played bass on "Cool Place To Park", while Michael Bishop (then Beefcake the Mighty) sang – though Bishop was capable of singing and playing at the same time, his thrashing and jumping made that impossible. Brockie also played bass on the tracks "Eat Steel" and "Fight", on Gwar's album This Toilet Earth (both these tracks feature Bishop's Beefcake on vocals). Additionally, Brockie played bass for X-Cops as Patrolman Cobb Knobbler, as well as the Dave Brockie Experience.

== Musical influences ==
Brockie stated he grew up a "rocker"; he started out listening to heavy metal as a kid, then immediately became more absorbed into punk rock as a teenager, especially the 1980s hardcore punk scene. Brockie stated his favorite punk bands were Bad Brains, Black Flag, Dayglo Abortions and Charged GBH. He got back into heavy metal when thrash metal bands, such as Metallica and Slayer began to emerge.

== Death ==
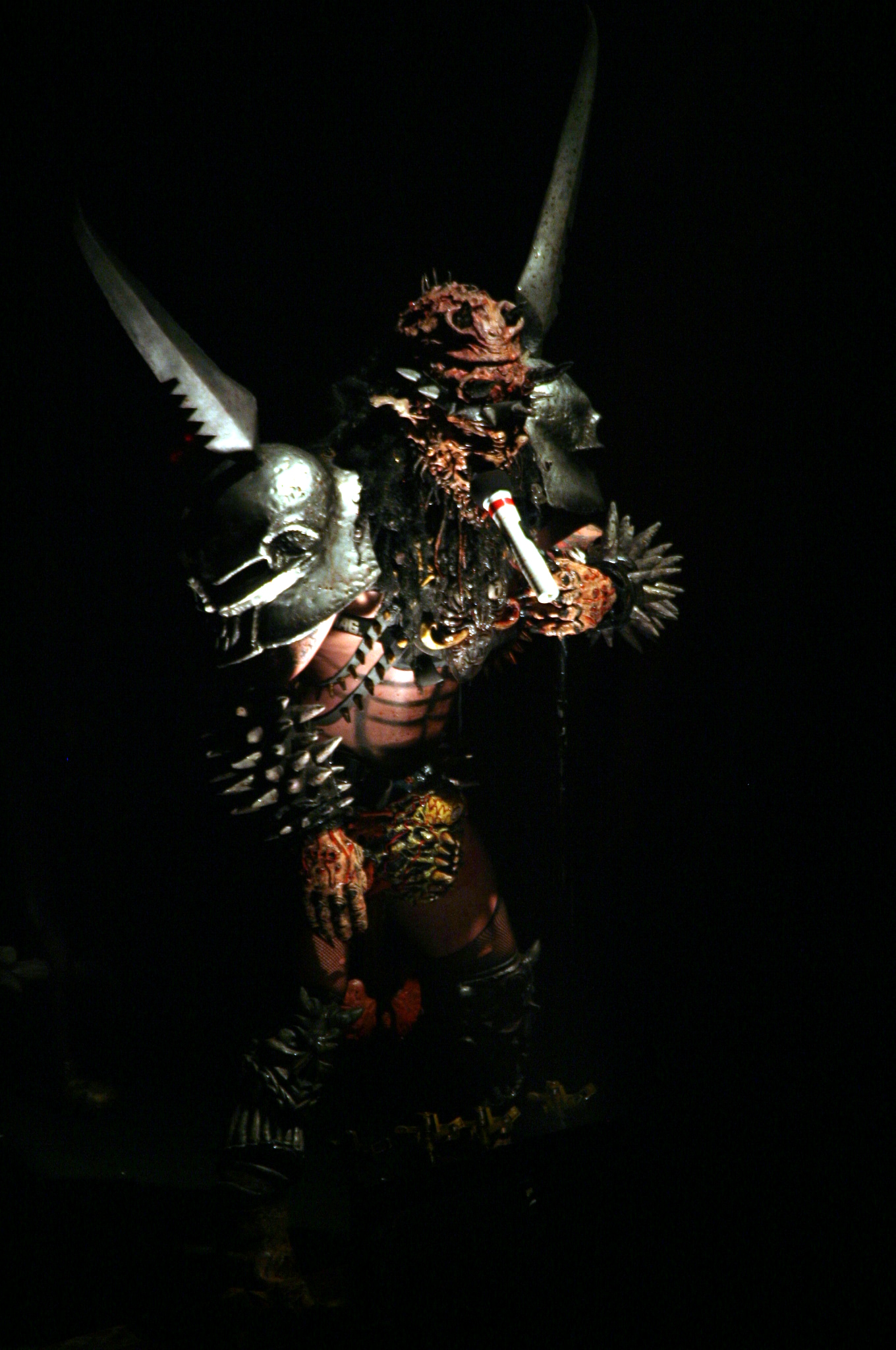
David Brockie as Oderus Urungus live on stage

On Sunday March 23, 2014, Brockie was found dead, his body sitting upright in a chair in his home, by fellow band member and roommate Jamison Land. The cause of death was determined to be a heroin overdose. Gwar's management confirmed Brockie's death on the official Gwar website on March 24.

Fellow musicians honored his memory, including Randy Blythe and Dave Grohl, as well as The Daily Beast writer Andy Hinds and The Daily Show host Jon Stewart. Oderus Urungus was given a traditional Viking funeral in a public memorial prior to the 5th annual Gwar-B-Q event on August 15, 2014. Brockie is not buried in Hollywood Cemetery in Richmond, Virginia, but has a memorial marker.

After Brockie's death, a fan petition was started to persuade the developers of Mortal Kombat X to include Oderus into the game as a tribute to Brockie. In addition, a second petition was made to persuade the developers of Killer Instinct to include Oderus.

As a part of the band's complex mythology, on the Gwar Eternal Tour, Mr. Perfect tells Gwar that he stole Oderus Urungus' immortality and impaled him on his own sword.

Brockie was survived by his father, William Brockie. In April 2015, William Brockie filed suit in Richmond, Virginia, Circuit Court against the surviving band members and their management company, Slave Pit Inc., seeking "$1 million in compensatory damages, punitive damages, and injunctive relief on claims of conversion, breach of contract, and unauthorized use of David Brockie's image."

== Discography ==
=== With Gwar ===
- Hell-O (1988)
- Scumdogs of the Universe (1990)
- America Must Be Destroyed (1992)
- This Toilet Earth (1994)
- Ragnarök (1995)
- Carnival of Chaos (1997)
- We Kill Everything (1999)
- Violence Has Arrived (2001)
- War Party (2004)
- Live From Mt. Fuji (2005)
- Beyond Hell (2006)
- Lust in Space (2009)
- Bloody Pit of Horror (2010)
- Battle Maximus (2013)

=== With Dave Brockie Experience ===
- Diarrhea of a Madman (2001)
- Live From Ground Zero (2002)
- Songs for the Wrong (2003)

=== With Death Piggy ===
- Love War 7-inch EP (1983)
- Death Rules the Fairway 7-inch EP (1984)
- R45 7-inch EP (1985)
- Smile Or Die!!! (1999) (compilation)

=== With X-Cops ===
- You Have the Right to Remain Silent... (1995)

== Bibliography ==
- Dave., Brockie (2010). Whargoul. Portland, OR: Deadite Press. ISBN 9781936383368. OCLC 785150673.
