= Jizmak Da Gusha =

Musician

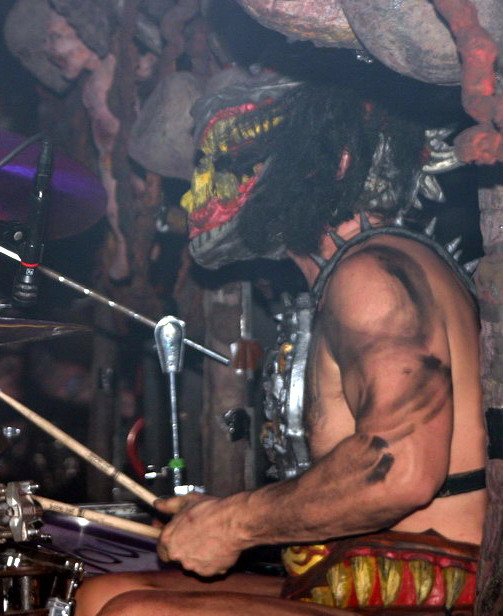

Background information
- Born: Brad Roberts
- Genres: Thrash metal; punk rock; shock rock
- Occupation: Drummer
- Years active: 1989–present
- Labels: Metal Blade; DRT Entertainment; Slave Pit Inc.
- Member of: Gwar; X-Cops
- Formerly of: Dave Brockie Experience
- Website: www.gwar.net

Jizmak Da Gusha is the drummer for the heavy metal band Gwar. Although the costume has undergone many changes since the character was introduced, Jizmak's onstage get-up somewhat resembles a monstrous dog with very large teeth. He is usually seen wielding a large warhammer, most likely a reference to his role as drummer in the band.

== Gwar mythos ==
According to Gwar mythos, Jizmak Da Gusha was a beast of tremendous power, native to a planet known as "The Wide Wide World of Sports", which, according to Balsac the Jaws of Death, has "lots of frisbees". He was frozen in a block of ice, presumably near the Gwar headquarters in Antarctica, for a millennium. When Gwar's former drummer Nippleus Erectus died after bathing in copious amounts of hydrochloric acid in the hope that it would work like LSD, and cause hallucinogenic effects, Gwar decided to thaw Jizmak to replace Nippleus.

This was actually to replace Nippleus' replacement, Lee Beato, who was only present for a very short time. His end came with his total conversion to a wisp. With Slave Pit Inc. focusing less time on the Gwar mythos, which was effectively concluded with the defeat of the Master in 2000, it is unlikely that more of his origin story will be revealed.

When Gwar was first formed, their drummer was a character named Hans Orifice. Hans was originally played by Sean Sumner. He was replaced after a few shows by Jim Thompson. By the time Gwar's first album Hell-O was released, the character of Hans Orifice had been replaced by Nippleus Erectus, played by Rob Mosby. Following the album's release, Mosby left the band and Pete Luchter served as Gwar's drummer under the alias Lee Beato.

Luchter had to leave the band after only a few gigs due to a nervous breakdown. Shortly afterwards, Brad Roberts joined the band as drummer and created the character Jizmak Da Gusha. Roberts played drums on Scumdogs of the Universe even though a misprint in the pressing accredited Mosby. Roberts also played drums for Gwar spinoff bands RAWG, X-Cops and The Dave Brockie Experience.

Roberts played drums for two X-Cops songs, "Beat You Down" and "Junkie," replacing Mike Dunn. He is featured as a vocalist on the song "Barbells" on the album "You Have The Right To Remain Silent...", though he is not the album's drummer.

Jizmak Da Gusha is the only central Gwar character who has been played by only one person (Brad Roberts). Roberts first started playing with Gwar in 1989, after the year's North American tour.

== Armor ==
Jizmak is the only character who does not wear his armor during concerts so as not to interfere with his mobility as a drummer. He has two-bladed arm coverings resembling dragon mouths, a "gut-plate", and a loin cloth. These costume pieces have undergone minor changes, getting more detailed as time progressed. His headpiece mostly had subtle changes until 2004.

In "Scumdogs of the Universe" and "America Must Be Destroyed" Jizmak had two big ears and a very large red jaw. The top half of his head was Roberts in makeup. Starting in "This Toilet Earth" and lasting until "Violence has Arrived" Jizmak had a similar red headpiece, except the ears were slightly shrunk, and a top half of the head was added. This had a doglike nose, beady black eyes, and a top jaw. The hair was removed from the costume, it being Roberts' real hair, and he wore it short for a time. For the most part, the lower jaw stayed the same. This was the longest lasting Jizmak head.

For the 2004 album "War Party" and 2005's "Live in Mt. Fuji" the headpiece was changed to closely resemble a wolf, with grey fur and distorted features. His hair was again long, like it is in real life. For the summer tour, as well as the new album, his costume, as with the entire band has undergone changes.

The mask retains lupine characteristics. The wolf's mouth is wider and the fur is brown, and the armor is composed of exposed muscle mass, as opposed to the Roman segmental armor he wore since "Violence has Arrived". In behind-the-scenes footage, the armor doesn't hinder his flexibility - he is able to reach all of his cymbals without trouble - and he is seen wearing it in the "School's Out" video and the Gwar cartoon.
