= Death Piggy =

American hardcore punk band

Death Piggy was an American hardcore punk band, that was formed in 1982 in Richmond, Virginia. They flourished briefly, before Dave Brockie, then their lead singer/bassist, decided to play a joke set while wearing monster costumes made by VCU art student Colette Miller, as an opening act for Death Piggy. This joke act would later be the basis for the heavy metal band Gwar. They put out a few 45s (some limited to 301 copies) and had a small yet loyal following. They played their last show in 1994, before the death of drummer Sean Sumner.

== Members ==
=== Original lineup ===
- Dave Brockie: Lead Vocals/Bass (a.k.a. Oderus Urungus from Gwar)
- Russ Bahorsky: Guitar/Vocals
- Sean Sumner: Drums

=== Later members ===
- Steve Douglas: guitar (replaced Russ after the "Death Rules the Fairway" single)

== Discography ==
- Love War 7-inch EP (1983)
1. G-O-D Spells God
2. Spatter Flick
3. Eat The People
4. Fat Man
5. Nympho
6. Bathtub In Space
7. No Prob, Dude
8. Mangoes & Goats
- Death Rules the Fairway 7-inch EP (1984)
1. Welcome To The Record
2. Boner
3. Showbiz
4. Dinner In The Morning
5. Whippin' Round The Bay
6. Ceramic Butt
- R45 7-inch EP (1985)
1. Poet
2. Ground "B" Sound
3. Joey Died Today
4. Minute 2 Live
- Smile Or Die!!! (1999)
  - compilation of all of the above 45s
- Studio Sessions 1984/85 (2016)
  - Vinyl re-release of Smile Or Die!!! with new artwork, exclusive to Spain
- Welcome To The Record (September 26, 2020, Record Store Day exclusive, gold vinyl, 1000 copies)
  - Vinyl compilation of Smile Or Die!!! with 3 additional tracks: Scabs / Ewoks / Fear of Murder
  - Also included a digital download that included 20 minute never-before heard live improv acoustic set from 1984, recorded as the band surprised business owners and pedestrians on the street with an impromptu performance.
