= X-Cops (band) =

American rock band

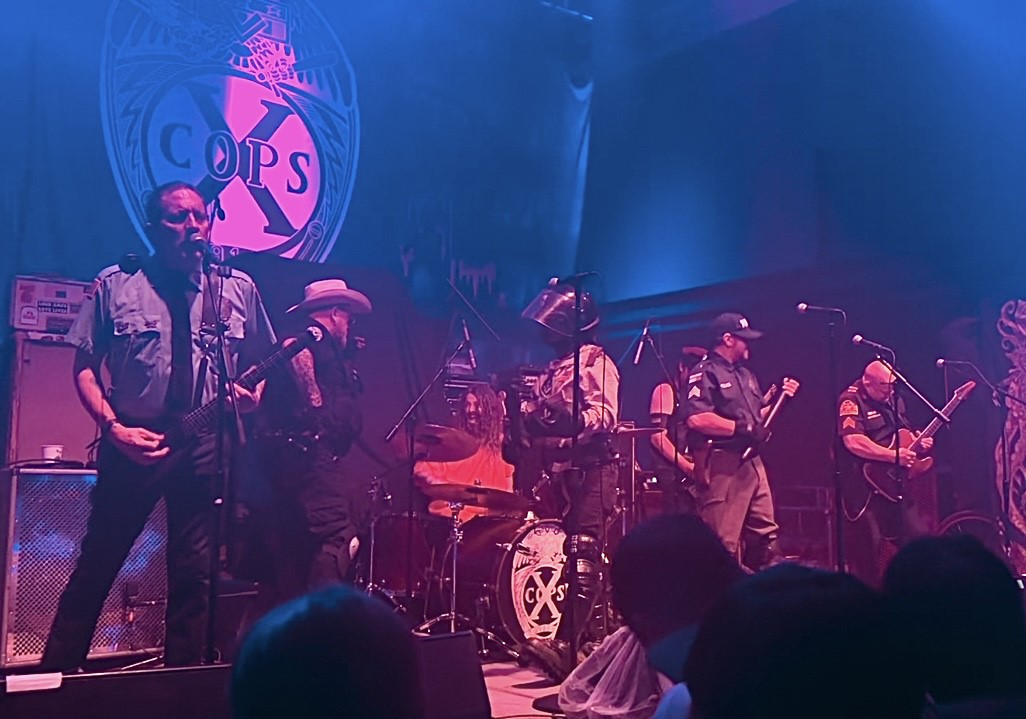
- The band "X-Cops" playing at the 9:30 Club in Washington, D.C., on June 9, 2024.

Background information
- Origin: Richmond, Virginia, U.S.
- Genres: Alternative metal
- Years active: 1994-1996, 2013, 2023-present
- Labels: Pit records
- Spinoff of: Gwar
- Website: https://xcops.net

X-Cops is a side project composed of members from the heavy metal band Gwar and their extended "family" of musicians. Each member of X-Cops performs in a police uniform and has their own character. They released the album You Have The Right To Remain Silent... on Metal Blade Records in 1995. The album included a cover of Deep Purple's "Highway Star" (with different lyrics, to reflect the theme of the album). In addition, they released a 7" single of the songs "Junkie" (featuring the first released vocal performance of Gwar/X-Cops guitarist Michael Derks) and "Beat You Down" on Man's Ruin Records in 1996.

X-Cops' style has been described as alternative metal.

== History ==
Peter Lee started the band after being shot in a failed car jacking attempt. The idea came while filming a commercial segment for Gwar's Skulhedface. Lee and Dave Brockie were dressed as police officers and Lee pondered, "What would be cooler than a bunch of cops playing kick-ass rock and roll?" This led to Lee, Brockie and Gwar's drum technician, Mike Dunn, starting X-Cops as a three-piece band. By the time they played their first show, their ranks had grown considerably.

X-Cops opened for Gwar on some dates of their 1994 tour. Essentially, the band members opened for themselves, as every musician in Gwar either played an instrument or sang in X-Cops. They also headlined a tour in 1995 and some select dates in 1996.

There are two additional songs that X-Cops performed live, but never officially recorded: "Nurture My Pig" (originally a song by The Loco Gringo's), and "Conflict Management" (sung by Zipper Pig). According to bootleg videos, Casey Orr (Tubb Tucker) played bass for "Conflict Management", taking the bass from Dave Brockie (Cobb Knobbler), who sang back-up.

In their first incarnation, X-Cops played their final show in 1996. Dave Brockie Experience later went on to perform X-Cops songs during live shows. X-Cops reunited for a performance at the 4th annual Gwar-B-Q in Richmond, VA, on August 17, 2013. The band reunited again a decade later in 2023, again as an opening act for Gwar. A new EP, titled XCAB, was released on June 28, 2024.

== Band members ==
=== Current members ===
- Michael Derks as Lt. Louie Scrapinetti (guitar)
- Pete Lee as Sgt. Al Depantsia (guitar)
- Casey Orr as Sheriff Tubb Tucker (lead vocals)
- Brad Roberts as Mountain Bike Officer Biff Buff (vocals)
- Bob Gorman as Sgt. Mason Zypygski aka Zipper Pig (vocals)
- Paul Burnette as Officer Ed Banger (bass)
- Ryan Parrish as Inmate #8048675309 (drums)

=== Former members ===
- Mike Dunn as Cadet Billy Club (drums)
- Dave Brockie as Patrolman Cobb Knobbler (bass)
- Dave Musel as Detective Phillip McRevis (samples)

== Discography ==
=== Albums ===
- You Have the Right to Remain Silent... (1995)

=== Singles ===
- Beat You Down / Junkie (1996, Limited to 2000 7" vinyl copies)
- Light 'Em Up (2024)

=== EPs ===
- XCAB (2024)
