= DRT Entertainment =

- Founded: March 2004
- Founder: Derek Shulman, Ron Urban, Theodore Green
- Defunct: 2009
- Status: Defunct
- Distributor: Fontana Distribution
- Genre: Rock
- Country of origin: U.S.
- Location: New York City

DRT Entertainment was a New York City based independent record label founded in March 2004 by Derek Shulman, Ron Urban, and Theodore "Ted" Green. The label is defunct.

The label advertised itself as an "artist friendly hard rock music company for bands with a touring fan base." The company was distributed by Universal Music Group's Fontana Distribution. DRT was also distributed by Universal Music Canada and a variety of companies in the rest of the world including Soulfood in Germany, Shock Records in Australia and JVC Records in Japan.

DRT had one subsidiary label, Brass Tacks Records. It was a vanity label founded by the Street Dogs.

In 2005, it released Alucard Music's "35th Anniversary" editions of many CDs by Gentle Giant, Shulman's former band. (Thirty-five years after the debut album.)

The label closed in 2009.

== Roster ==
- 36 Crazyfists
- American Head Charge
- Aphasia
- Artimus Pyledriver
- Blindside
- Clutch
- Fu Manchu
- Gwar
- John Wesley Harding
- Lit
- Lynam
- Edwin McCain
- Powerman 5000
- The Rasmus
- Rikets
- Seven Mary Three
- SOiL
- U.P.O.

== See also ==
- List of record labels
