= Beefcake the Mighty =

Bassist of American heavy metal band Gwar

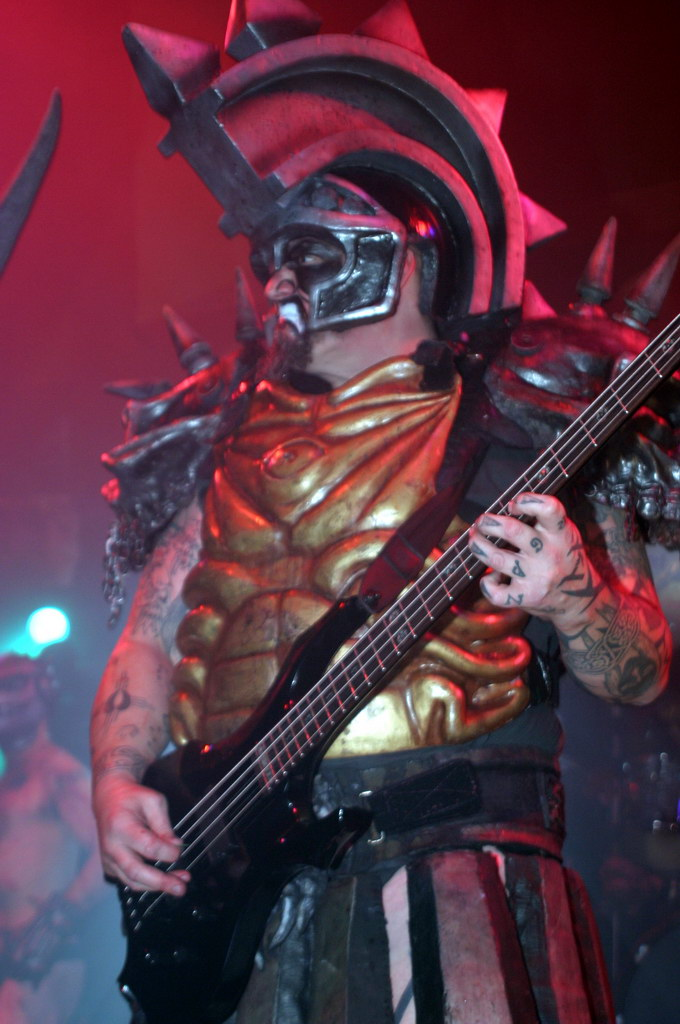
- Todd Evans as Beefcake the Mighty in 2004

Background information
- Born: Michael Bishop (1987–1993, 1998–1999); Casey Orr (1994–1997, 1999–2002, 2008–2011, 2019-present); Todd Evans (2002–2008); Jamison Land (2011–2019)
- Genres: Thrash metal, punk rock, shock rock
- Occupation: Musician
- Instruments: Bass, vocals
- Years active: 1987–present
- Website: gwar.net

Beefcake the Mighty is the bass guitarist of the heavy metal band Gwar. The character appears as a stout humanoid (hence his name), girded in Roman-style armor. He is usually portrayed wielding either an oversized Gladius sword or a large battle-axe. Since 2019, Beefcake has been portrayed by Casey Orr, one of several musicians to portray the character over the band's history.

== Background ==
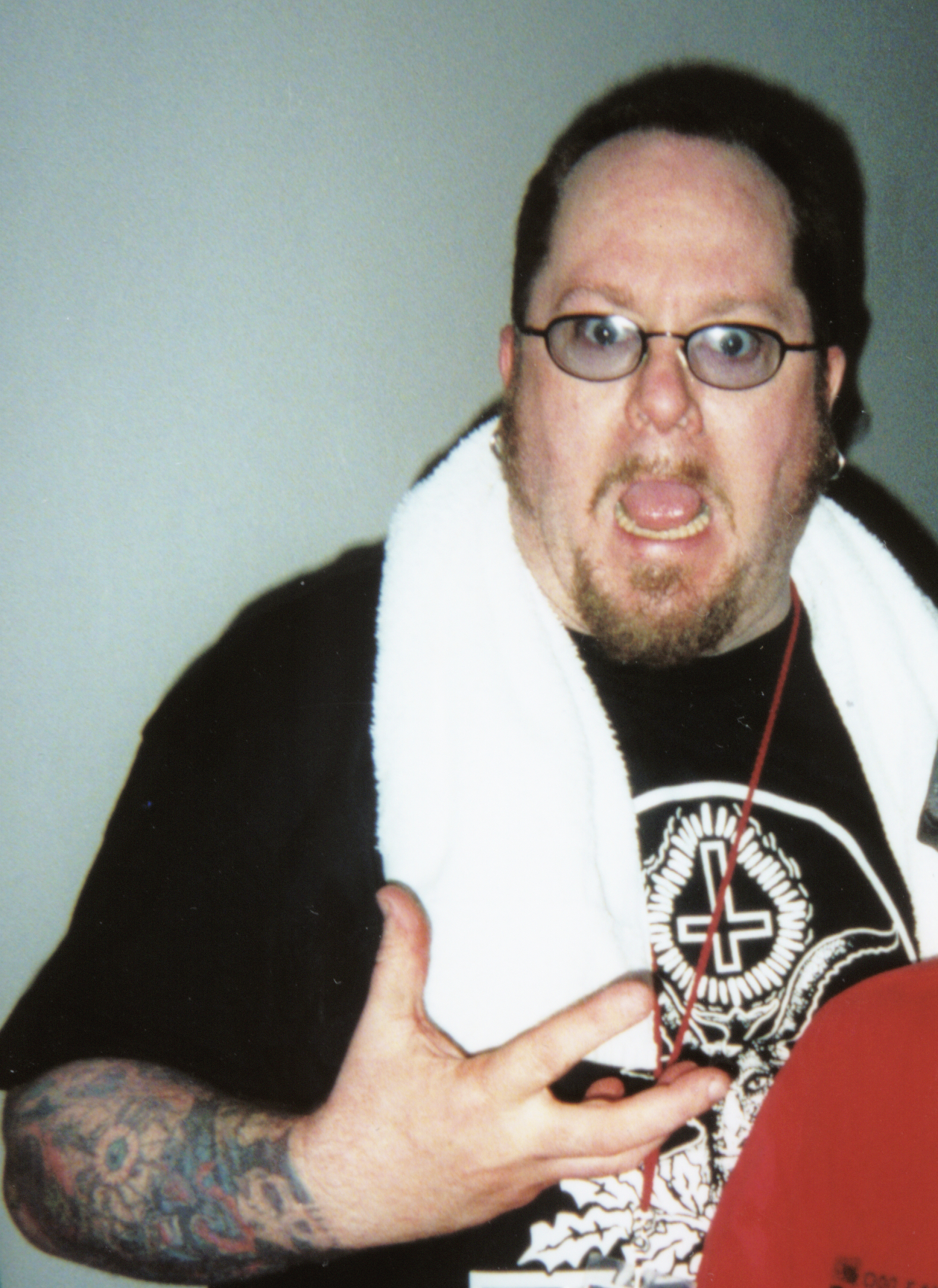
Casey Orr out of costume

According to Gwar mythos, Beefcake originates from the planet Cholesterol (where he met singer Oderus Urungus). He weighs approximately 299 tons and "invented music by stretching dinosaur guts across the Grand Canyon".

In the early days of Gwar, Balsac the Jaws of Death played bass and Beefcake played guitar. However by the time Gwar's first album Hell-O had been released, the roles had switched, and Beefcake became the permanent bass player.

Before their first album, the character of Beefcake was known as Cornelius Carnage and was played by Greg Ottiger. Soon, however, Cornelius Carnage's character was developed into Beefcake the Mighty. When Hell-O was released in 1988, Beefcake was played by Michael Bishop. Bishop played the role until after the 1993 Halloween mini-tour (after recording This Toilet Earth, which would be released in January 1994). Former Rigor Mortis bassist Casey Orr was then enlisted to succeed him in February 1994.

Bishop temporarily replaced Orr for a stint around the recording of We Kill Everything. After the release of Violence Has Arrived in 2001, Orr and his wife had a baby. He left the band shortly thereafter, and was replaced by Todd Evans. Evans suited the role well, as he is credited as being much larger than any of the previous Beefcakes.

Evans continued to portray Beefcake for several years. Orr briefly returned to fill in for the 2007 European tour when Evans could not participate. In Spring 2008, Evans left Gwar to focus on his band, Mobile Deathcamp. On April 15, 2008, Casey Orr officially announced his return to the band, donning the armor of Beefcake the Mighty once more.

Beefcake's personality has changed considerably since Hell-O. Oderus Urungus and Beefcake originally had an almost brotherly relationship, and the dialog between the two reflected such. When Michael Bishop was replaced by Casey Orr, that relationship changed as well – instead, Beefcake became extremely arrogant ("Beef is an arrogant bastard with absolutely no regard for feelings of others. No one likes him and he wouldn't have it any other way. His ill temper and egotistical vanity make him the perfect rock star. He feels everyone is entitled to his opinion and if you don't like it you can fuck off.") and vile.

He was crude even to Oderus (as indicated in the dialogue between the two in "Dawn of the Day of the Night of the Penguins," between "Horror of Yig" and "Hate Love Songs"). While Bishop returned for We Kill Everything, his personality remained the same (possibly because Orr returned after the album was recorded). Little is known about Todd Evans' take on Beefcake, though his entries in the Gwar.net blog again reflect extreme arrogance ("Feast on the limitless knowledge that your puny, under-developed mind craves...and feel free to ask what you will, you just may warrant a reply, but probably not so don't hold your breath!").

On August 2, 2011, Casey Orr, once again, officially announced his amicable departure from Gwar and expressed his desire to pursue other projects. Orr joined the reformed Ministry. Jamison Land, a guitarist from The Burial, took on the role after Orr's departure.

Land announced his departure from the band in February 2019. As a result, Orr returned to the band as the character.

== Armor ==
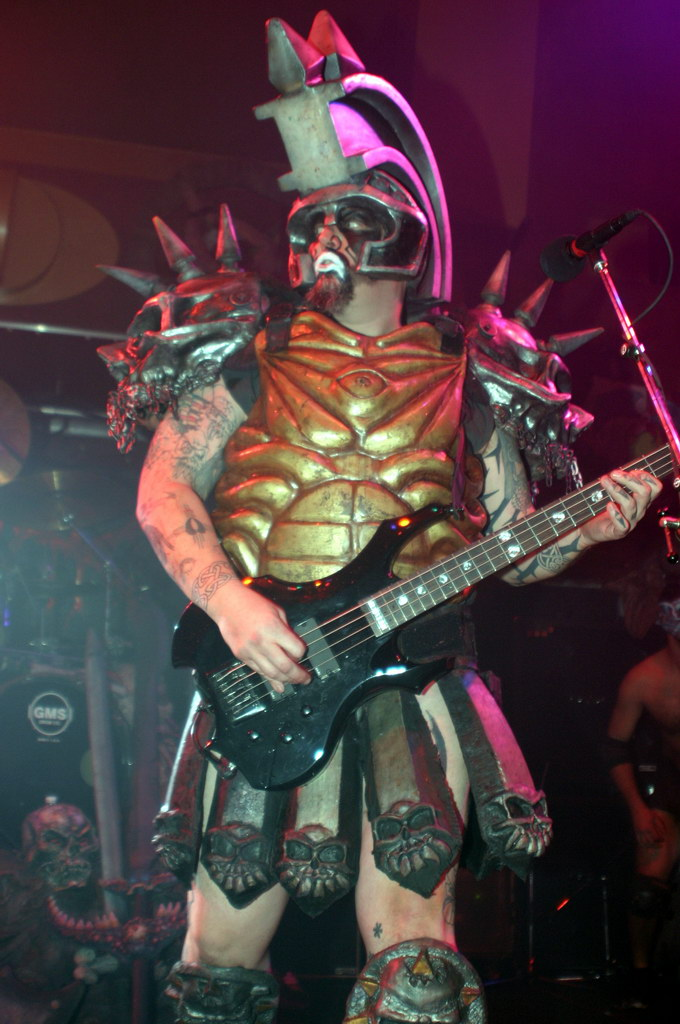
Todd Evans as Beefcake the Mighty live on stage

Beefcake the Mighty has had relatively few fundamental design changes in his armor from his inception: he has always worn a perversion of the Roman legionnaire armor, though his helmet somewhat resembles the corinthian style helmets of Greece. However, as Gwar became more successful, they had more resources to upgrade their costumes (which began primarily as papier-mache). Most of the changes have been subtle, and were/are largely based on available materials and the bassist's size (Evans was reputed to be much larger than either Bishop or Orr, both large men themselves).

== Contributions as vocalist ==
Beefcake is the most frequent guest vocalist in Gwar, having sung lead on "Cool Place to Park", "The Road Behind", "Pussy Planet", "Eat Steel", "Fight", "Crush, Kill, Destroy", "Hate Love Songs", "The Bonus Plan", "Metal Metal Land", "The Price of Peace" and "Beat You to Death". Beefcake has always had a relatively high voice, in sharp contrast to his large size.
