= List of Gwar members =

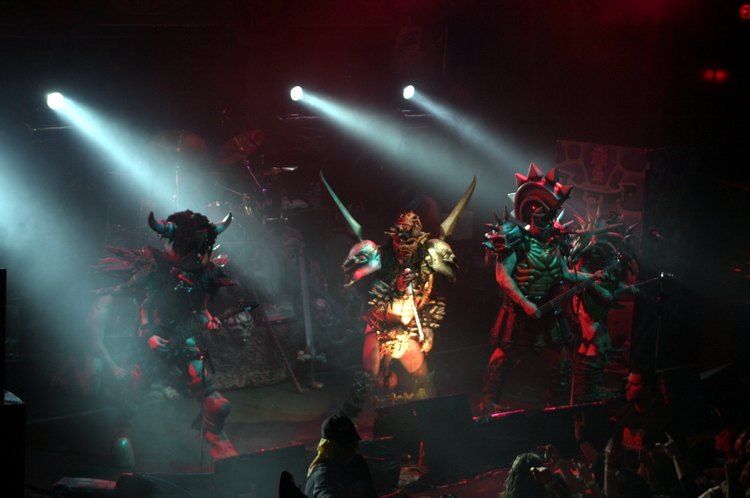
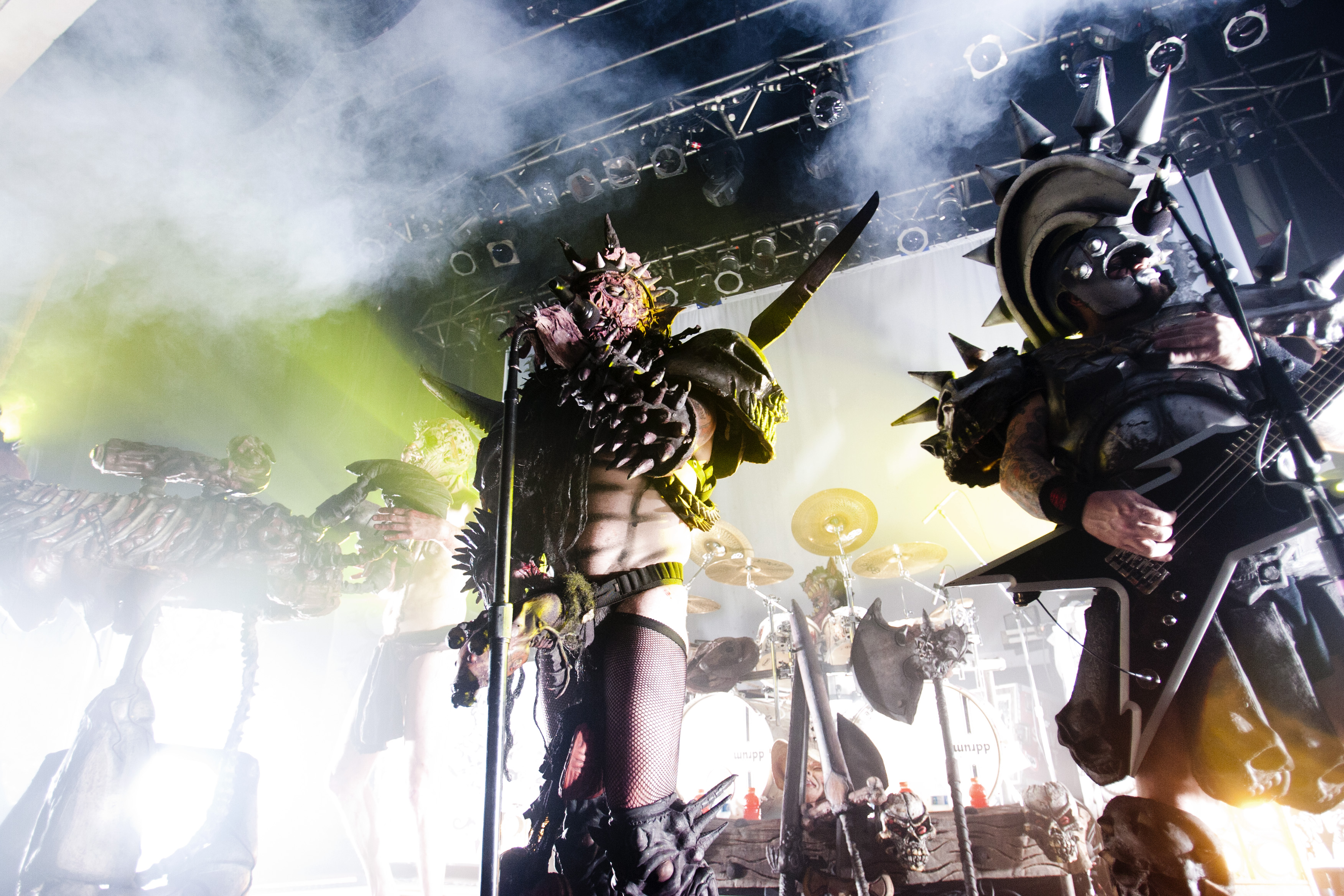
Former lineups of Gwar performing live in 2004 (top) and 2008 (bottom).

Gwar is an American heavy metal band from Richmond, Virginia. Formed in 1985, the group's core thematic and visual concept revolves around an elaborate science fiction-themed mythology, which portrays each of the band members as barbaric interplanetary warriors. The band's original lineup featured vocalist Ben Eubanks (as the character of Johnny Slutman), guitarists Dave Brockie (Oderus Urungus), Russ Bahorsky (Mr. Magico) and Steve Douglas (Jaws of Death), bassist Chris Bopst (Balsac), and drummer Sean Sumner.

As of Brockie's death in 2014, Gwar currently features no original members, with a lineup of rhythm guitarist Mike Derks (Balsac the Jaws of Death, since 1988), drummer Brad Roberts (Jizmak Da Gusha, since 1989), lead vocalist Mike Bishop (Blöthar the Berserker, since 2014; previously a bassist for the band starting in 1987), bassist Casey Orr (Beefcake the Mighty, who first joined in 1994), and guitarist Tommy Meehan (Grodius Maximus, since 2024).

== History ==
=== 1985–1987 ===
Gwar was originally formed as a "joke band" under the name Gwaaarrrgghhlllgh by members of Richmond-based hardcore punk group Death Piggy, serving as the opening act at the band's live shows. According to co-founder Dave Brockie, early performances featured "a mish-mash of Death Piggy and Alter Natives musicians". Gwaaarrrgghhlllgh debuted on March 25, 1985, in its original form, with the "first real GWAR show with plot characters" following in October.

The lineup for the first two shows featured lead vocalist Ben Eubanks (Johnny Slutman), guitarists Brockie (Oderus Urungus), Russ Bahorsky (Mr. Magico) and Steve Douglas (Jaws of Death), bassist Chris Bopst (Balsac) and drummer Sean Sumner. Eubanks, Bahorsky, Douglas and Sumner all left after the first two shows.

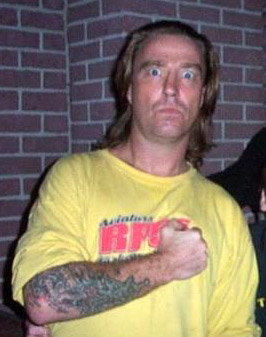
After starting out as a guitarist for the band, Dave Brockie took over lead vocals for Gwar in 1986.

Returning later in 1985, Gwar featured a lineup of Brockie and Bopst alongside new vocalist Joe Annaruma (Joey Slutman), guitarists Greg Ottenger (Cornelius Carnage) and Ron Curry (Stephen Sphincter), and drummer Jim Thomson (Hans Sphincter); this core lineup was often joined live by Hunter Jackson (Techno Destructo) and Mike Delaney (The Executioner) on backup vocals.

Early demo recordings from this lineup were eventually issued as part of the 2004 collection Let There Be Gwar. In 1986, Annaruma left after allegedly "trying to fuck Techno's girlfriend, The Temptress", with Brockie taking over the role of Gwar's lead vocalist. The band played one show with guitarist Tim Harriss playing "an unnamed character with a big headdress and a spiked tail", before settling on a two-guitarist lineup.

=== 1987–1992 ===
In early 1987, Ottinger, Bopst and Thomson all left Gwar, after their main band Alter Natives signed with SST Records. Hunter Jackson, founder of Slave Pit Inc. and designer of the band's original costumes, had also moved away, which led to the introduction of Dave Musel in his place. Brockie, along with satellite members Don Drakulich (Sleazy P. Martini), Mike Delaney (The Executioner) and Chuck Varga (The Sexecutioner), then rebuilt the band with the addition of guitarist Dewey Rowell and drummer Rob Mosby from local group White Cross, as well as returning guitarist Steve Douglas and new bassist Mike Bishop. New characters were also created – Flattus Maximus for Rowell, Balsac the Jaws of Death for Douglas, Beefcake the Mighty for Bishop and Nippleus Erectus for Mosby.

The lineup of Brockie, Rowell, Douglas, Bishop and Mosby recorded Gwar's debut album Hell-O, which was released in 1988. During a subsequent tour, Douglas left the band due to personal differences with Bishop, as well as his continued presence in multiple bands. The guitarist was replaced by Mike Derks, who took over the character of Balsac the Jaws of Death. The group continued touring until early 1989, when Mosby also left following a string of "sexual indiscretions" and creative differences. He was replaced by Pete Luchter (Lee Beato), who remained for a short time before leaving after being subjected to what Brockie described as "a brutal hazing ritual".

After the departures of Mosby followed by Luchter, Gwar completed a 1989 tour with former drummer Lee Thomson, this time as the character Hans Orifice. Brad Roberts took over later in the year as Jizmak da Gusha, in time for the recording of the band's second album Scumdogs of the Universe. After a lengthy touring cycle, Rowell left in 1991 and was not immediately replaced. Instead, Derks was aided for the recording of America Must Be Destroyed by session guitarists Tim Harriss and Brian Fechino, and for the start of the subsequent touring cycle by Barry Ward.

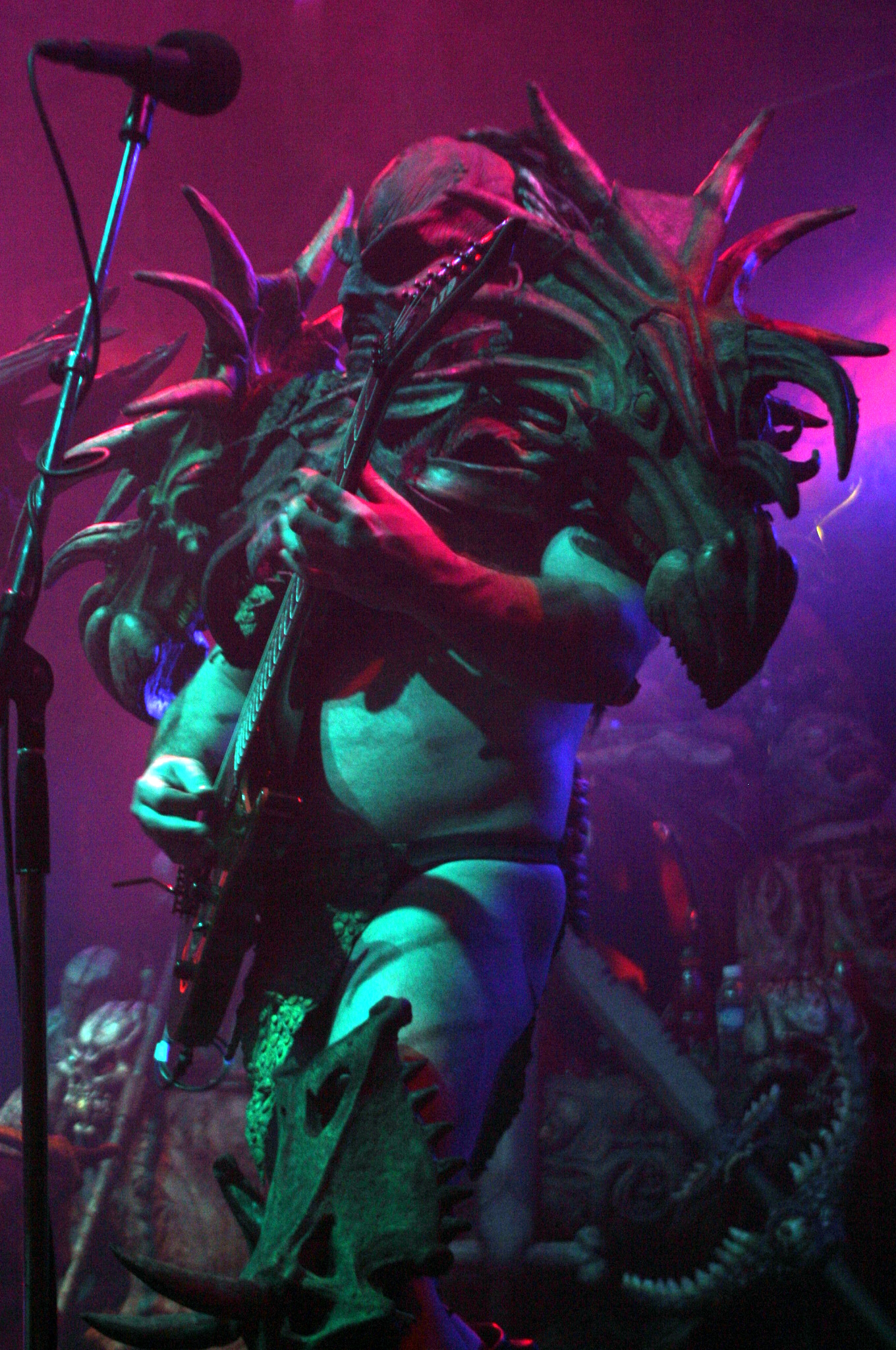
The role of Flattus Maximus, lead guitarist, changed many times throughout the 1990s and 2000s.

=== 1992–2011 ===
Following the release and initial promotion of America Must Be Destroyed, a permanent replacement for Dewey Rowell was found in Pete Lee, who took on the vacated role of Flattus Maximus. During the recording of the band's next album This Toilet Earth in April 1993, Lee was shot in the stomach when he got out of the band's van to investigate a robbery going on in front of them. He eventually recovered and returned to the band, several months later. Shortly thereafter, in late 1993, Bishop left Gwar, citing an anxiety disorder and interpersonal problems with bandmates, especially Lee, as reasons for his departure. Casey Orr took his place in February 1994.

With Lee and Orr in the lineup, Gwar released Ragnarök in 1995 and Carnival of Chaos in 1997, before Lee was forced to leave at the end of 1997 due to continuing health problems caused by the 1993 shooting. After Orr also left early the next year to return home to Texas, the remaining trio of Brockie, Derks and Roberts began to work on writing material for the band's next release We Kill Everything, before Bishop and Tim Harriss both returned to the group for the recording of the album.

Before the release of We Kill Everything, Orr returned to Gwar and Harriss was replaced by Zach Blair. Just one album came from the lineup, 2001's Violence Has Arrived, before both Blair and Orr left in the summer of 2002, and were replaced in September by Cory Smoot and Todd Evans, respectively. After releasing two studio albums – War Party in 2004 and Beyond Hell in 2006 – Evans left Gwar in April 2008 to focus on his other group Mobile Deathcamp, in which he performs lead vocals and his favoured instrument, guitar. Two weeks later, it was announced by guitarist Mike Derks that Casey Orr would return in Evans' place for his third tenure with the group.

=== Since 2011 ===
After a three-year spell spawning the albums Lust in Space and Bloody Pit of Horror, bassist Casey Orr left Gwar for a third time to focus on his bands in his home state of Texas, primarily Rigor Mortis. In October, Jamison Land was announced as the new Beefcake the Mighty. The following month, however, lead guitarist Cory Smoot was found dead during a North American tour. The cause of death was revealed in December to have been coronary thrombosis, caused by his pre-existing coronary artery disease.

The group continued the tour following Smoot's death, with Brockie explaining that "Although the great temptation would be to return home, curl into a fetal position, and mourn, we can't do that. First off, Cory wouldn't want that. He would want us to go on and would be pissed if we didn't. Plus we know the fans don't want us to quit. They are going to want a chance to come to grips with their loss, and there is no better place to do that than at a Gwar show."

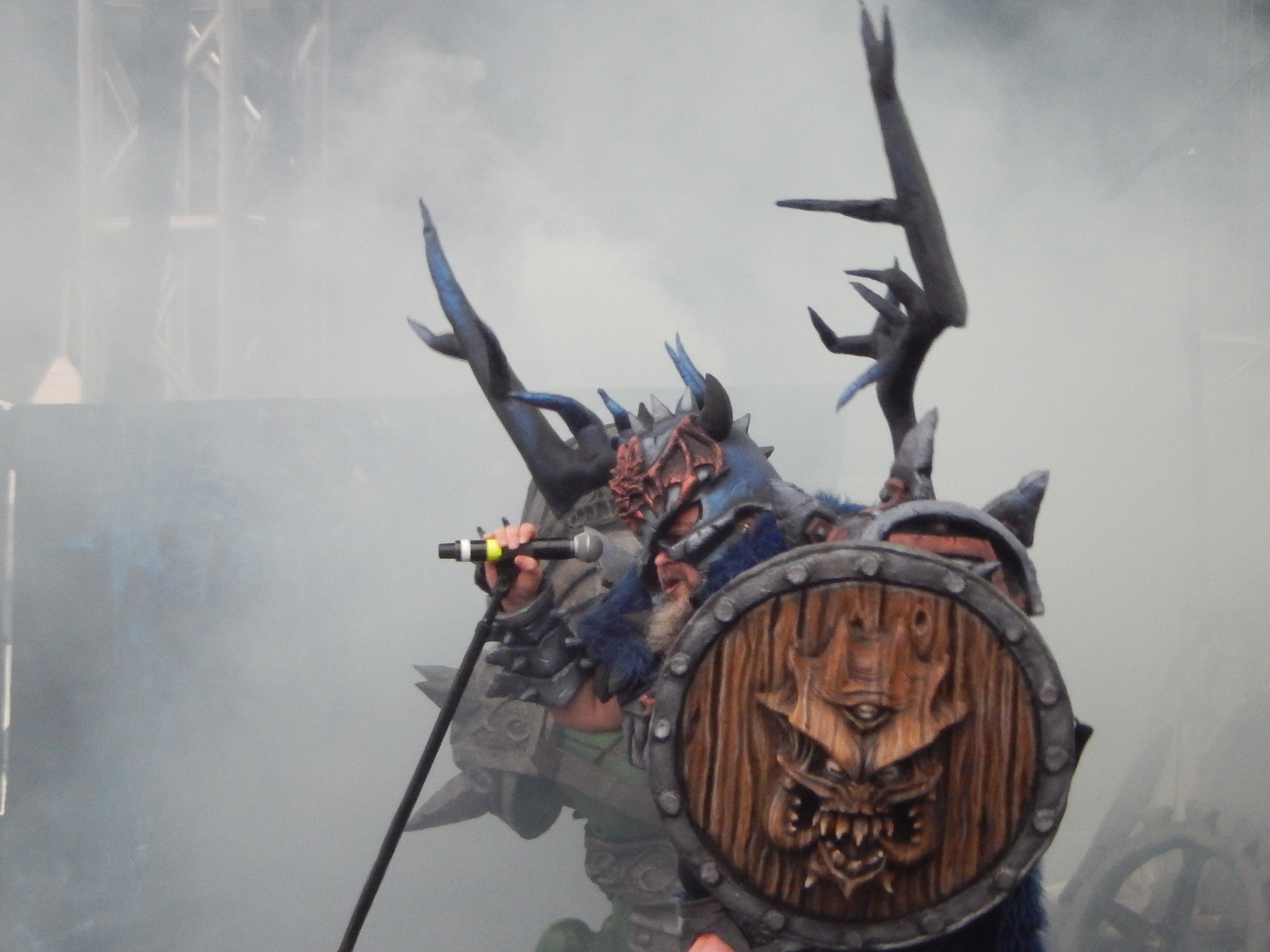
Former bassist Mike Bishop returned in 2014 as Blöthar the Berserker, taking over lead vocals following Brockie's death.

Gwar returned to its five-piece lineup in August 2012 with the addition of Cannabis Corpse guitarist Brent Purgason, who took on the new character of Pustulus Maximus after Flattus was retired following Smoot's death. He debuted on Battle Maximus, which was released the following September. The album proved to be the last for Gwar's sole constant member Dave Brockie, who died on March 23, 2014. It was announced later that the cause of the singer's death was an accidental heroin overdose.

In August 2014, Gwar returned at its annual Gwar-B-Q festival, performing with former bassist Mike Bishop in the new character of Blöthar the Berserker on lead vocals. Bishop was later joined by Kim Dylla, serving as another new character called Vulvatron, as the band's second lead vocalist. She lasted only a few months, however, and it was announced the following May that she had left the band, with Purgason claiming that "Kim did a great job, but we wanted to go a different direction with the Vulvatron character. You will absolutely see more of Vulvatron in the future, just not portrayed by Kim. There is no ill will, no acrimony, and no drama ... it just isn't what we needed in the character."

Gwar released its first album since Brockie's death and Bishop's return, The Blood of Gods, in October 2017. In February 2019, bassist Land announced that he had left Gwar to return to his home state of Kentucky, in order to "spend more time with family and to focus on [his] driving career". When the band announced its Use Your Collusion Tour a few months later, it was revealed that Casey Orr had returned for his fourth tenure as Beefcake the Mighty.

In November 2023, lead guitarist Purgason announced his departure from the band on his Instagram.

In February 2024 Tommy Meehan joined the band.

== Core band members ==
=== Current ===
| Image | Name | Years active | Character(s) | Instruments | Release contributions |
|---|---|---|---|---|---|
| | Mike Bishop | 1987–1993; 1998–1999; 2014–present | Blöthar the Berserker (since 2014); Beefcake the Mighty (1987–93 and 1998–99) | lead vocals, occasional bass (since 2014); bass, backing and occasional lead vocals (1987–93 and 1998–99) | all Gwar releases from Hell-O (1988) to This Toilet Earth (1994); We Kill Everything (1999); The Blood of Gods (2017); The Disc with No Name (2021); Scumdogs XXX Live! (2021); The New Dark Ages (2022) |
| | Mike Derks | 1988–present | Balsac the Jaws of Death | rhythm and lead guitar; backing vocals | all Gwar releases from The Next Mutation (1989) onwards |
| | Brad Roberts | 1989–present | Jizmak da Gusha | drums; percussion | all Gwar releases from The Next Mutation (1989) onwards |
| | Casey Orr | 1994–1997; 1999–2002; 2008–2011; 2019–present | Beefcake the Mighty | bass; backing and occasional lead vocals | all Gwar releases from "S.F.W." (1995) to The Dawn of the Day of the Night of the Penguins (1998), and from Lust in Space (2009) to Electile Disfunction '08 (2013); You're All Worthless and Weak (2001); Violence Has Arrived (2001); Blood Drive 2002 (2002); The Disc with No Name (2021); Scumdogs XXX Live! (2021); The New Dark Ages (2022) |
| | Tommy Meehan | 2024–present | Grodius Maximus | lead guitar; backing vocals | none |

=== Former ===
| Image | Name | Years active | Character(s) | Instruments | Release contributions |
|---|---|---|---|---|---|
| | Dave Brockie | 1985–2014 (until his death) | Oderus Urungus | lead vocals, occasional bass (from 1986); guitar, backing vocals (1985–86) | all Gwar releases from Hell-O (1988) to The 4th Annual Gwar-B-Q 2013 (2014) |
| | Chris Bopst | 1985–1987 | Balsac | bass; backing vocals | Let There Be Gwar (2004) |
| | Steve Douglas | 1985; 1987–1988 | Jaws of Death (1985); Balsac the Jaws of Death (1987–88) | guitar; backing vocals | Hell-O (1988) |
| | Ben Eubanks | 1985 | Johnny Slutman | lead vocals | none – two live performances only |
| | Russ Bahorsky | 1985 | Mr. Magico | guitar; backing vocals | none – two live performances only |
| | Sean Sumner | 1985 (died 1996) | none | drums; percussion | none – two live performances only |
| | Jim Thomson | 1985–1987; 1989 | Hans Sphincter (1985–87); Hans Orifice (1989) | drums; percussion | Let There Be Gwar (2004) |
| | Greg Ottinger | 1985–1987 | Cornelius Carnage | lead and rhythm guitars; backing vocals | Let There Be Gwar (2004) |
| | Ron Curry | 1985–1987 | Stephen Sphincter | lead and rhythm guitars; backing vocals | Let There Be Gwar (2004) |
| | Joe Annaruma | 1985–1986 | Joey Slutman | lead vocals | Let There Be Gwar (2004) – four tracks only |
| | Tim Harriss | 1986; 1991; 1998–1999 | Flattus Maximus | lead guitar; backing vocals | We Kill Everything (1999) |
| | Dewey Rowell | 1987–1991 | Flattus Maximus | guitar; backing vocals | all Gwar releases from Hell-O (1988) to Tour de Scum (1992) |
| | Rob Mosby | 1987–1989 | Nippleus Erectus | drums; percussion | Hell-O (1988) |
| | Pete Luchter | 1989 | Lee Beato | drums; percussion | none – live performances only |
| | Pete Lee | 1992–1998 | Flattus Maximus | lead guitar; backing vocals | all Gwar releases from This Toilet Earth (1994) to The Dawn of the Day of the Night of the Penguins (1998) |
| | Zach Blair | 1999–2002 (plus session guest 2013) | Flattus Maximus | lead guitar; backing vocals | You're All Worthless and Weak (2001); Violence Has Arrived (2001); Blood Drive 2002 (2002); Battle Maximus (2013) – guest appearance on six tracks |
| | Cory Smoot | 2002–2011 (until his death) | Flattus Maximus | lead guitar; backing and occasional lead vocals | all Gwar releases from War Party (2004) to Electile Disfunction '08 (2013) |
| | Todd Evans | 2002–2008 (plus session guest 2013) | Beefcake the Mighty | bass; backing and occasional lead vocals; guitar (2013) | all Gwar releases from War Party (2004) to Beyond Hell Live (2007); Battle Maximus (2013) – guest appearance on two tracks |
| | Jamison Land | 2011–2019 | Beefcake the Mighty | bass; backing vocals | The 3rd Annual Gwar-B-Q 2012 (2013); Battle Maximus (2013); The 4th Annual Gwar-B-Q 2013 (2014); The Blood of Gods (2017) |
| | Brent Purgason | 2012–2023 | Pustulus Maximus | lead guitar; backing vocals | The 3rd Annual Gwar-B-Q 2012 (2013); Battle Maximus (2013); The 4th Annual Gwar-B-Q 2013 (2014); The Blood of Gods (2017); The Disc with No Name (2021); Scumdogs XXX Live! (2021); The New Dark Ages (2022) |
| | Kim Dylla | 2014–2015 | Vulvatron | co-lead vocals | none – live performances only |

== Supporting personnel ==
=== Current ===
| Image | Name | Year joined | Character(s) | Details |
|---|---|---|---|---|
| | Bob Gorman | 1988–2000; 2001–2002; 2014–present | Muzzle Slave; Bone Snapper | Gorman first started working with Gwar and Slave Pit Inc. in 1988, before becoming a full-time member two years later and working in a wide range of creative and onstage roles. In recent years, Gorman has returned to Gwar live shows as the regular character Bone Snapper, and has performed vocals on recent releases. |
| | Matt Maguire | 1991-2000; 2001–2002; 2007–present | Mattron; MX2; Sawborg Destructo | Maguire has been a member of the Slave Pit since 1991 (with a few breaks to focus on other projects), debuting on Gwar tours in 1992 and becoming the band's stage manager in 1996. He has played many characters and gone under a number of names, including Mattron, MX2, and most recently Sawborg Destructo. |

=== Former ===
| Image | Name | Years active | Character(s) | Details |
|---|---|---|---|---|
| | Hunter Jackson | 1985–1986; 1987–2000 | Techno Destructo; Scroda Moon | Jackson, a costume designer, was a co-founder of Slave Pit Inc. and a member of the original Gwar lineup as the character of Techno Destructo. He left in late 1986 after moving to Detroit, Michigan, but returned around a year later, remaining with the group until moving away again in 2000. He has also played Scroda Moon. |
| | Mike Delaney | 1985–1987; 1993–1994 | The Executioner (1985–86); Cardinal Syn (1986–87) | Delaney was one of the original members of the creative group behind Gwar, helping to produce stage props and sometimes performing with the band. He originally played the character of the Executioner, but when Chuck Varga joined and became the Sexecutioner, Delaney changed to Cardinal Syn. He would later return in the mid-1990s. |
| | Heather Broome | 1985–1986 | Gwar Woman (1985–86); The Temptress (1986) | Broome was the first person to play the Gwar Woman character, playing at early live shows during the band's first year and becoming the Temptress upon the addition of a second female member, Colette Miller. |
| | Don Drakulich | 1986–1996; 2007–2009; 2014; 2017 | Techno Destructo (1986–87); Sleazy P. Martini (since 1987) | Drakulich became a member of Gwar in 1986, contributing special effects and working on elements of the group's costume design and production. He appears onstage as Gwar's manager Sleazy P. Martini (after briefly replacing Hunter Jackson as Techno Destructo), has toured for a number of years, and has appeared on various releases. |
| | Dave Musel | 1986–1999 | Müsel | After Hunter Jackson left in 1986, the band brought in Dave Musel as its new primary costume designer. He initially played a number of characters onstage, before settling into a primarily "behind the scenes" role credited only as "Müsel". Musel's musical role included live keyboards and samples, for which he is credited on 1995's Ragnarok. |
| | Mike Bonner | 1986–1998 | Slave | Bonner joined the Gwar collective in 1986 and is credited with the conception and introduction of the "Gwar Slave" character, the first of many miscellaneous monikers he played. He left in 1998, which according to former member Danielle Stampe (Slymenstra Hymen) he did to focus on his family life and a construction business. |
| | Chuck Varga | 1986–1997; 2001; (died 2026) | The Sexecutioner | Varga was a special effects designer, sculptor and illustrator who co-founded Slave Pit Inc. in 1985 and was a founding member of Gwar. He performed regularly with the band as The Sexecutioner, featuring on several albums and videos released by the band. He left in 1997 when he moved away to focus on theatre and film production. Varga died in September 2026. |
| | Colette Miller | 1986–1987 | Amazina (1986); Gwar Woman (1986–87) | Miller joined Gwar while Heather Broome was still a member and remained for almost two years, taking on the character of Amazina until Broome left and Miller remained the sole Gwar Woman. |
| | Adam Green | 1986–1987 | Slave | Green was the live and in-studio sound engineer for Gwar during its early performances. |
| | Lisa Harrelson | 1987–1988 | Gwar Woman | Harrelson was the third person to portray the Gwar Woman character, joining after Miller's departure in 1987. |
| | Scott Krahl | 1987–2014 | Cock & Balls Slave | Krahl joined the Gwar collective in 1987 and worked in several creative roles. |
| | Danielle Stampe | 1988–2000; 2002–2003; 2008; 2014; 2020 | Slymenstra Hymen | Stampe took over the role of "Gwar Woman" from Harrelson, after originally assisting with various creative tasks, before creating the character of Slymenstra Hymen and performing backing vocals and dancing. She left in 2000 (save for a few subsequent appearances) and was the last female member of the Gwar collective until 2014. |
| | Danny Black | 1989–1992 | Slave | Black joined as Gwar's first official roadie in 1989, worked with the band for three years and appeared on Live from Antarctica and Phallus in Wonderland before departing in 1992. |
| | Brian Fechino | 1991 | none | Fechino performed guitars on America Must Be Destroyed following the 1991 departure of Dewey Rowell. |
| | Barry Ward | 1992 | none | Before Pete Lee took Rowell's place permanently, Ward performed on the America Must Be Destroyed tour. |
| | Mike Dunn | 1992–1997 | Slave | Dunn originally joined the Gwar collective in 1992 as a drum technician and later became a full-time member of the Slave Pit in 1994. He was also the drummer for the Gwar-related band X-Cops. |
| | Davis Bradley | 1997–2003 | Slave | Bradley first started working with Slave Pit Inc. in 1995, before moving to Richmond and joining the collective officially two years later, primarily on video production and costume fabrication. Within six years, he had retired from touring with the band due to a spinal injury, making only sporadic appearances in the future. |

== Lineups ==
| Period | Members | Releases |
|---|---|---|
| 1985 | Dave Brockie – guitars, backing vocals; Chris Bopst – bass, backing vocals; Russ "Mr. Magico" Bahorsky – guitars, backing vocals; Steve Douglas – guitars, backing vocals; Sean Sumner – drums; Ben "Johnny Slutman" Eubanks – lead vocals | none |
| 1985–1986 | Dave Brockie (Oderus Urungus) – guitars, backing vocals; Chris Bopst (Balsac) – bass, backing vocals; Greg Ottenger (Cornelius Carnage) – guitars, backing vocals; Ron Curry (Stephen Sphincter) – guitars, backing vocals; Jim Thomson (Hans Sphincter) – drums; Joe Annaruma (Joey Slutman) – lead vocals | Let There Be Gwar (2009) – four tracks |
| 1986 | Dave Brockie (Oderus Urungus) – lead vocals; Chris Bopst (Balsac) – bass, backing vocals; Greg Ottenger (Cornelius Carnage) – guitars, backing vocals; Ron Curry (Stephen Sphincter) – guitars, backing vocals; Jim Thomson (Hans Sphincter) – drums; Tim Harriss (unnamed character) – guitars, backing vocals | none |
| 1986 – early 1987 | Dave Brockie (Oderus Urungus) – lead vocals; Chris Bopst (Balsac) – bass, backing vocals; Greg Ottenger (Cornelius Carnage) – guitars, backing vocals; Ron Curry (Stephen Sphincter) – guitars, backing vocals; Jim Thomson (Hans Sphincter) – drums | Let There Be Gwar (2009) – other tracks |
| Spring 1987 – early 1988 | Dave Brockie (Oderus Urungus) – lead vocals; Mike Bishop (Beefcake the Mighty) – bass, backing vocals; Dewey Rowell (Flattus Maximus) – lead guitar, backing vocals; Rob Mosby (Nippleus Erectus) – drums; Steve Douglas (Balsac the Jaws of Death) – rhythm guitar, backing vocals | Hell-O (1988) |
| 1988–1989 | Dave Brockie (Oderus Urungus) – lead vocals; Mike Bishop (Beefcake the Mighty) – bass, backing vocals; Dewey Rowell (Flattus Maximus) – lead guitar, backing vocals; Rob Mosby (Nippleus Erectus) – drums; Mike Derks (Balsac the Jaws of Death) – rhythm guitar, backing vocals | none |
| 1989 | Dave Brockie (Oderus Urungus) – lead vocals; Mike Bishop (Beefcake the Mighty) – bass, backing vocals; Dewey Rowell (Flattus Maximus) – lead guitar, backing vocals; Mike Derks (Balsac the Jaws of Death) – rhythm guitar, backing vocals; Pete Luchter (Lee Beato) – drums | none |
| 1989 | Dave Brockie (Oderus Urungus) – lead vocals; Mike Bishop (Beefcake the Mighty) – bass, backing vocals; Dewey Rowell (Flattus Maximus) – lead guitar, backing vocals; Mike Derks (Balsac the Jaws of Death) – rhythm guitar, backing vocals; Jim Thomson (Hans Orifice) – drums | none |
| Late 1989 – summer 1991 | Dave Brockie (Oderus Urungus) – lead vocals; Mike Bishop (Beefcake the Mighty) – bass, backing vocals; Dewey Rowell (Flattus Maximus) – lead guitar, backing vocals; Mike Derks (Balsac the Jaws of Death) – rhythm guitar, backing vocals; Brad Roberts (Jizmak da Gusha) – drums | The Next Mutation (1989); Scumdogs of the Universe (1990); Live from Antarctica (1990); All the Sex (1992); Twice the Violence (1992) |
| Summer 1991 – spring 1992 | Dave Brockie (Oderus Urungus) – lead vocals; Mike Bishop (Beefcake the Mighty) – bass, backing vocals; Mike Derks (Balsac the Jaws of Death) – guitars, backing vocals; Brad Roberts (Jizmak da Gusha) – drums | America Must Be Destroyed (1992) |
| Spring 1992 – late 1993 | Dave Brockie (Oderus Urungus) – lead vocals; Mike Bishop (Beefcake the Mighty) – bass, backing vocals; Mike Derks (Balsac the Jaws of Death) – rhythm guitar, backing vocals; Brad Roberts (Jizmak da Gusha) – drums; Pete Lee (Flattus Maximus) – lead guitar, backing vocals | This Toilet Earth (1994) |
| February 1994 – late 1997 | Dave Brockie (Oderus Urungus) – lead vocals; Mike Derks (Balsac the Jaws of Death) – rhythm guitar, backing vocals; Brad Roberts (Jizmak da Gusha) – drums; Pete Lee (Flattus Maximus) – lead guitar, backing vocals; Casey Orr (Beefcake the Mighty) – bass, backing vocals | "S.F.W." (1995); Ragnarök (1995); Carnival of Chaos (1997); A Surprising Burst of Chocolaty Fudge: Hell-Oween 97 (1997); Dawn of the Day of the Night of the Penguins (1998) |
| Late 1997 – early 1998 | Dave Brockie (Oderus Urungus) – lead vocals; Mike Derks (Balsac the Jaws of Death) – guitars, backing vocals; Brad Roberts (Jizmak da Gusha) – drums; Casey Orr (Beefcake the Mighty) – bass, backing vocals | none |
| Early – September 1998 | Dave Brockie (Oderus Urungus) – lead vocals, bass; Mike Derks (Balsac the Jaws of Death) – guitars, backing vocals; Brad Roberts (Jizmak da Gusha) – drums | none |
| September 1998 – early 1999 | Dave Brockie (Oderus Urungus) – lead vocals; Mike Derks (Balsac the Jaws of Death) – rhythm guitar, backing vocals; Brad Roberts (Jizmak da Gusha) – drums; Mike Bishop (Beefcake the Mighty) – bass, backing vocals; Tim Harriss (Flattus Maximus) – lead guitar, backing vocals | We Kill Everything (1999) |
| Early 1999 – summer 2002 | Dave Brockie (Oderus Urungus) – lead vocals; Mike Derks (Balsac the Jaws of Death) – rhythm guitar, backing vocals; Brad Roberts (Jizmak da Gusha) – drums; Casey Orr (Beefcake the Mighty) – bass, backing vocals; Zach Blair (Flattus Maximus) – lead guitar, backing vocals | You're All Worthless and Weak (2001); Violence Has Arrived (2001); Blood Drive 2002 (2002) |
| Late 2002 – April 2008 | Dave Brockie (Oderus Urungus) – lead vocals; Mike Derks (Balsac the Jaws of Death) – rhythm guitar, backing vocals; Brad Roberts (Jizmak da Gusha) – drums; Cory Smoot (Flattus Maximus) – lead guitar, backing vocals; Todd Evans (Beefcake the Mighty) – bass, backing vocals | War Party (2004); War Party Tour 2004 (2004); Live from Mt. Fuji (2005); Beyond Hell (2006); Beyond Hell Live (2007) |
| April 2008 – August 2011 | Dave Brockie (Oderus Urungus) – lead vocals; Mike Derks (Balsac the Jaws of Death) – rhythm guitar, backing vocals; Brad Roberts (Jizmak da Gusha) – drums; Cory Smoot (Flattus Maximus) – lead guitar, backing vocals; Casey Orr (Beefcake the Mighty) – bass, backing vocals | Lust in Space (2009); "Stripper Christmas Summer Weekend" (2009); Lust in Space: Live at the National (2010); Bloody Pit of Horror (2010); "Isn't This Disgusting" (2011); Electile Disfunction '08 (2013) |
| October – November 2011 | Dave Brockie (Oderus Urungus) – lead vocals; Mike Derks (Balsac the Jaws of Death) – rhythm guitar, backing vocals; Brad Roberts (Jizmak da Gusha) – drums; Cory Smoot (Flattus Maximus) – lead guitar, backing vocals; Jamison Land (Beefcake the Mighty) – bass, backing vocals | none |
| November 2011 – August 2012 | Dave Brockie (Oderus Urungus) – lead vocals; Mike Derks (Balsac the Jaws of Death) – guitars, backing vocals; Brad Roberts (Jizmak da Gusha) – drums; Jamison Land (Beefcake the Mighty) – bass, backing vocals | none |
| August 2012 – March 2014 | Dave Brockie (Oderus Urungus) – lead vocals; Mike Derks (Balsac the Jaws of Death) – rhythm guitar, backing vocals; Brad Roberts (Jizmak da Gusha) – drums; Jamison Land (Beefcake the Mighty) – bass, backing vocals; Brent Purgason (Pustulus Maximus) – lead guitar, backing vocals | Battle Maximus (2013) |
| May – September 2014 | Mike Derks (Balsac the Jaws of Death) – rhythm guitar, backing vocals; Brad Roberts (Jizmak da Gusha) – drums; Jamison Land (Beefcake the Mighty) – bass, backing vocals; Brent Purgason (Pustulus Maximus) – lead guitar, backing vocals; Mike Bishop (Blöthar the Berserker) – lead vocals | none |
| September 2014 – May 2015 | Mike Derks (Balsac the Jaws of Death) – rhythm guitar, backing vocals; Brad Roberts (Jizmak da Gusha) – drums; Jamison Land (Beefcake the Mighty) – bass, backing vocals; Brent Purgason (Pustulus Maximus) – lead guitar, backing vocals; Mike Bishop (Blöthar the Berserker) – lead vocals; Kim Dylla (Vulvatron) – female vocals | none |
| May 2015 – February 2019 | Mike Derks (Balsac the Jaws of Death) – rhythm guitar, backing vocals; Brad Roberts (Jizmak da Gusha) – drums; Jamison Land (Beefcake the Mighty) – bass, backing vocals; Brent Purgason (Pustulus Maximus) – lead guitar, backing vocals; Mike Bishop (Blöthar the Berserker) – lead vocals | The Blood of Gods (2017) |
| March 2019 – November 2023 | Mike Derks (Balsac the Jaws of Death) – rhythm guitar, backing vocals; Brad Roberts (Jizmak da Gusha) – drums; Brent Purgason (Pustulus Maximus) – lead guitar, backing vocals; Mike Bishop (Blöthar the Berserker) – lead vocals; Casey Orr (Beefcake the Mighty) – bass, backing vocals | The Disc with No Name (2021); Scumdogs XXX Live! (2021); The New Dark Ages (2022) |
| November 2023 – February 2024 | Mike Derks (Balsac the Jaws of Death) – guitars, backing vocals; Brad Roberts (Jizmak da Gusha) – drums; Mike Bishop (Blöthar the Berserker) – lead vocals; Casey Orr (Beefcake the Mighty) – bass, backing vocals | none |
| February 2024 – present | Mike Derks (Balsac the Jaws of Death) – rhythm guitar, backing vocals; Brad Roberts (Jizmak da Gusha) – drums; Mike Bishop (Blöthar the Berserker) – lead vocals; Casey Orr (Beefcake the Mighty) – bass, backing vocals; Tommy Meehan (Grodius Maximus) – lead guitar, backing vocals | none |
