= Gwar discography =

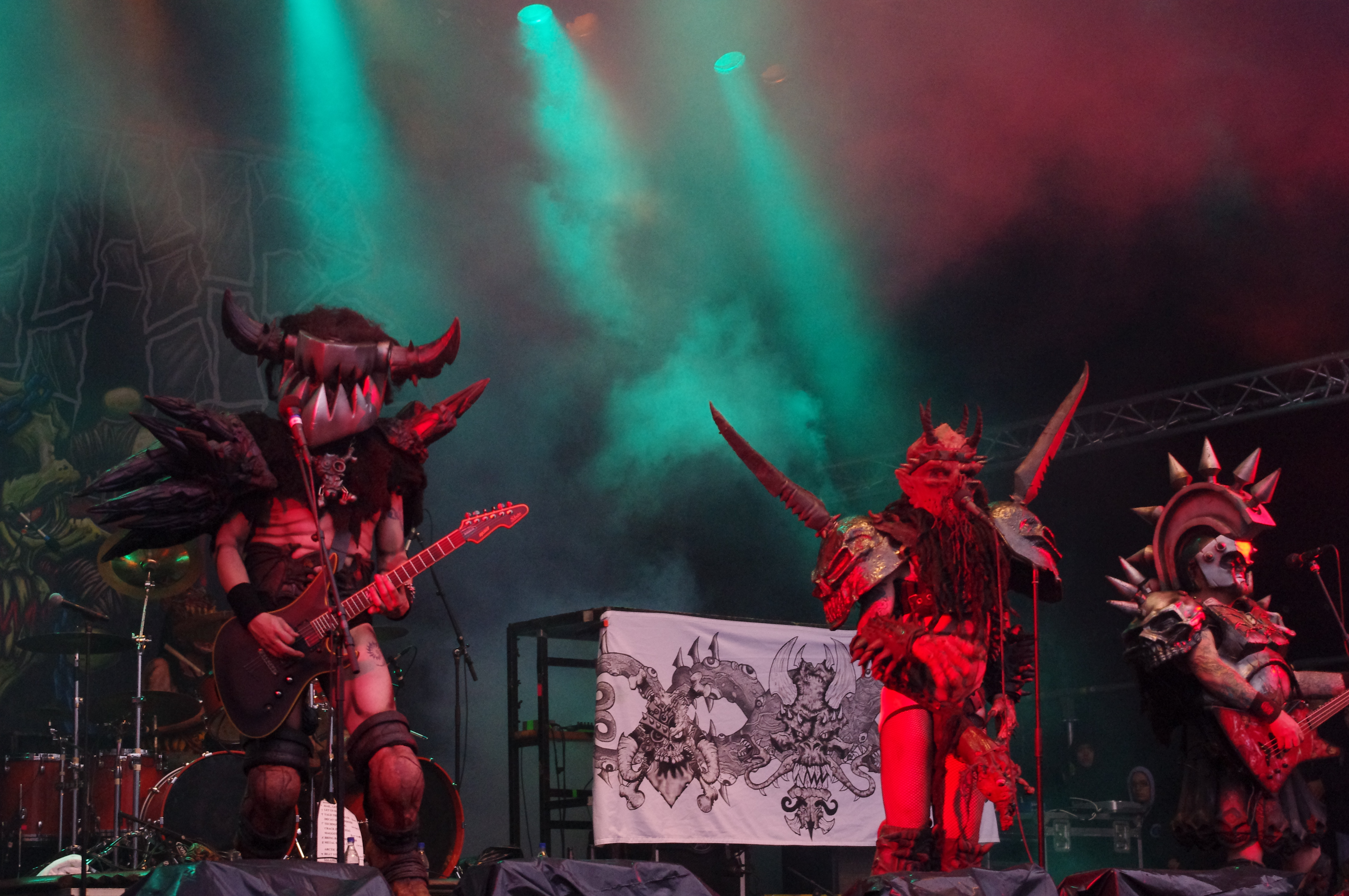
- Gwar performing in 2011
- Studio albums: 15
- Extended plays: 2
- Live albums: 2
- Compilation albums: 2
- Video albums: 23

Gwar is an American heavy metal band formed in Richmond, Virginia in 1984. Their discography includes fifteen studio albums, two live albums, two compilation albums, and two EPs. The band has also released nine singles.

== Discography ==
=== Studio albums ===
Year	Album details	Peak chart positions				Sales
Year	Album details	US	US Indie	CAN	AUS	Sales
1988	Hell-O: First studio album; Released: September 11, 1988; Label: Metal Blade	—	—	—	—	
1990	Scumdogs of the Universe: Second studio album; Released: January 8, 1990; Label: Metal Blade	—	—	194	—	US: 108,285
1992	America Must Be Destroyed: Third studio album; Released: March 31, 1992; Label: Metal Blade	177	—	—	—	US: 96,623
1994	This Toilet Earth: Fourth studio album; Released: March 29, 1994; Label: Priority/Metal Blade	—	—	—	—	
1995	Ragnarök: Fifth studio album; Released: October 24, 1995; Label: Priority/Metal Blade	—	—	—	—	
1997	Carnival of Chaos: Sixth studio album; Released: March 25, 1997; Label: Metal Blade	—	—	113	88	
1999	We Kill Everything: Seventh studio album; Released: April 6, 1999; Label: Metal Blade	—	—	90	121	
2001	Violence Has Arrived: Eighth studio album; Released: November 6, 2001; Label: Metal Blade	—	33	77	94	
2004	War Party: Ninth studio album; Released: October 26, 2004; Label: DRT	—	43	—	—	
2006	Beyond Hell: Tenth studio album; Released: August 29, 2006; Label: DRT	—	17	—	—	
2009	Lust in Space: Eleventh studio album; Released: August 18, 2009; Label: Metal Blade	96	17	—	105	
2010	Bloody Pit of Horror: Twelfth studio album; Released: November 9, 2010; Label: Metal Blade	—	29	—	—	
2013	Battle Maximus: Thirteenth studio album; Released: September 17, 2013; Label: Metal Blade	109	19	—	—	
2017	The Blood of Gods: Fourteenth studio album; Released: October 20, 2017; Label: Metal Blade	—	12	12	—	
2022	The New Dark Ages: Fifteenth studio album; Released: June 3, 2022; Label: Pit Records	—	—	—	—	
"—" denotes a release that did not chart.

=== EPs ===
Year	Title
1992	The Road Behind: Released: Label: Metal Blade
2021	The Disc with No Name: Released: May 28, 2021; Label: Slave Pit Records
2025	The Return of Gor Gor: Released: July 25, 2025; Label: Pit Records/Z2 Comics

=== Live albums ===
Year	Title
2000	You're All Worthless and Weak: Released: Label: Slave Pit Records
2005	Live from Mt. Fuji: Released: Label: DRT Entertainment

=== Compilation albums ===
Year	Title
2000	Slaves Going Single: Released: Label: Slave Pit Records
2004	Let There Be Gwar: Released: Label: Slave Pit Records

== Videography ==
Year	Title
1988	Shimmy Disc Video Compilation V.1
1989	RAWGwar
1989	The Next Mutation
1990	Live from Antarctica
1992	Phallus in Wonderland
1992	All the Sex
1992	Twice the Violence
1992	Tour De Scum
1994	TVD
1994	Skulhedface
1996	Return of Techno-Destructo
1997	Rendezvous with RagNaRok
1998	Surprising Burst of Chocolaty Fudge
1998	Dawn of the Day of the Night of the Penguins
2000	It's Sleazy
2002	The Gwarnage Campaign
2002	Blood Drive 2002
2002	Ultimate Video Gwarchive
2004	War Party Tour 2004
2006	Blood Bath and Beyond
2007	Beyond Hell Live
2010	Lust In Space – Live At The National
2013	Electile Disfunction '08
2021	Scumdogs XXX Live
2021	This is Gwar
