= Violence Has Arrived =

Studio album by Gwar
- Released: November 6, 2001
- Recorded: 2001
- Genre: Thrash metal
- Length: 43:17
- Label: Metal Blade Records
- Producers: Grant Rutledge, Gwar

Gwar chronology
You're All Worthless and Weak (2000)	Violence Has Arrived (2001)	War Party (2004)

Professional ratings
Review scores
Source	Rating
Allmusic	3/5 stars
Rock Hard	5/10 stars

Violence Has Arrived is the eighth studio album by the American heavy metal band Gwar. It was released on November 6, 2001, through Metal Blade Records.

According to an interview with Dave Brockie, it was originally supposed to be released on September 11, 2001, but Metal Blade would not release it until November. According to Slave Pit Inc., it was not finished. According to other official sources, they did not even start recording the album until July, and the Dave Brockie Experience had a tour in September.

== Overview ==
Violence Has Arrived re-attains the brutal focus of the band's earlier albums. It has more of a thrash metal sound than any of their previous albums. It is similar to Scumdogs of the Universe, in that Dave Brockie was the dominant voice of the band again, and the theme is centered on generalized carnage. Gwar takes on more "medieval" themes this time, such as torture ("The Wheel") and conjures up some truly ugly imagery in songs such as "Licksore", "Beauteous Rot", "Immortal Corrupter" and "The Apes of Wrath". "Biledriver" is about a fluid-spewing cannon, which can be seen in the "Immortal Corrupter" video and on tour. The cannon itself has now become something of a staple at their live shows.

"The Song of Words", inspired by the 11th-century French epic poem The Song Of Roland, is the only song with the voices of Jizmak Da Gusha (though Jizmak would later sing part of "El Presidente" on the album The Blood of Gods) and Flattus Maximus (though Maximus did sing lead vocals on the 2009 album Lust in Space), though neither of them are really singing. Nobody is really singing on the song (Beefcake the Mighty, Balsac the Jaws of Death and Oderus Urungus all speak, as opposed to sing - appropriately for a "Song of Words"). Technically, it is tied with "Jiggle The Handle" for the most vocalists on a Gwar song, though Maximus and Da Gusha each have five words. Indeed, the entire album has a narrative feel to it.

Though touching on the "Gwar lore" that began on Hell-O, Violence Has Arrived follows no individual story. This was, in large part, because of the disappointing reaction to We Kill Everything by the band, and due to Slave Pit Inc.'s diminished ranks - the previous year Danielle Stampe (Slymenstra Hymen) and Hunter Jackson (Techno Destructo) had left, as well as "slave" Davis Bradley (though retired from touring for spinal reasons, he did build the Biledriver).

The cover artwork was created by the Games Workshop illustrator Adrian Smith. There are two versions of the illustration used for the cover. That on the album cover shows Oderus with a codpiece and the poster in the booklet has the Cuttlefish of Cthulhu uncovered.

== Departures ==
Violence Has Arrived was Casey Orr's last Gwar album before he took an extended leave from the band. It is also the only Gwar album with Zach Blair on guitar. Blair left in early 2002, while Orr left shortly before the Halloween 2002 tour. Orr has since returned to the band twice, replacing Todd Evans in April 2008 then Jamison Land in 2019. "Immortal Corrupter" is the only video from this album, and shows Orr in the role of Beefcake the Mighty.

It is the final album on Metal Blade Records until 2009. In a 2004 interview, Beefcake the Mighty (then portrayed by Todd Evans) said that the reason for the switch was because Metal Blade had some European distribution problems, and they were not being fixed. However, Brockie has also said that their departure was a result of them being denied payments owed to them for a number of years, due to the poor sales of the previous two albums, which also led to cutting off the Europe deal. The band returned to Metal Blade Records for their 2009 release, Lust in Space.

== "Immortal Corrupter" ==
"Immortal Corrupter" is the only song on Violence Has Arrived with a music video, and is found only on the Ultimate Video Gwarchive DVD, released at the end of 2002. The DVD features commentary from Brockie, Scott Krahl, Matt Maguire, Bob Gorman and Michael Derks, with special commentary from Mike Bonner for the video to "The Road Behind". The video is Casey Orr's final video. Zach Blair had left just prior to recording, so fill-in Flattus Tim Harriss (who portrayed Flattus on their previous album) had to wear the Violence Has Arrived-era Flattus costume for the video.

The spelling for "Immortal Corrupter" is incorrect - the word "corruptor" does not have the letter e. It is corrected on the back cover of Live from Mt. Fuji. The video has it with the Violence Has Arrived spelling.

"Immortal Corrupter" was one of the two songs from this album to appear on Live From Mt. Fuji, along with "Biledriver". Both are favorite concert songs, by fans and band alike.

== Reaction ==
Violence Has Arrived was an album that the band enjoyed recording - "Everyone was ecstatic when Gwar put out “Violence Has Arrived” in 2001 — it marked Gwar's triumphant return to metal, and the world breathed a collective sigh of relief that we hadn't put out another “We Kill Everything”" (from a March 23, 2006, news entry at gwar.net) - and is still featured heavily on tour, be it in song ("Biledriver" is often used to end shows) or in theme (storyless carnage has been a big part of Gwar's tours in the past few years, though that changed in fall 2006, with the tour supporting Beyond Hell). Violence Has Arrived was also a more successful album in terms of album sales, which had been on the decline since Ragnarök.

When asked about his favorite Gwar album to listen to, Don Drakulich (Sleazy P. Martini) named this album.

== Track listing ==
No.	Title	Length
1.	"Hell Intro"	1:00
2.	"Battle Lust"	3:02
3.	"Abyss of Woe"	3:38
4.	"Anti-Anti Christ"	3:14
5.	"The Apes of Wrath"	3:15
6.	"Immortal Corrupter"	5:35
7.	"Beauteous Rot"	2:55
8.	"Licksore"	1:41
9.	"Bloody Mary"	4:07
10.	"Biledriver"	2:41
11.	"The Wheel"	3:48
12.	"The Song of Words" (Vocals by Oderus Urungus, BalSac the Jaws of Death, Beefcake the Mighty, Jizmak Da Gusha, and Flattus Maximus)	3:32
13.	"Happy Death-Day"	4:18

== Personnel ==
- Dave Brockie (Oderus Urungus) – lead vocals
- Zach Blair (Flattus Maximus) – lead guitar, background vocals
- Mike Derks (Balsac the Jaws of Death) – rhythm guitar, background vocals
- Casey Orr (Beefcake the Mighty) – bass guitar, background vocals
- Brad Roberts (Jizmak Da Gusha) – drums, percussion
- Manisha Joshi – additional vocals on "Beauteous Rot"
