= Diarrhea (disambiguation) =

Diarrhea or diarrhoea is liquid defecation.

Diarrhea may also refer to:

== Music ==
- Diarrhea Planet, a garage punk band (formed 2009)
- Live Fast, Diarrhea, a 1995 album by The Vandals
- Diarrhea of a Madman, a 2001 album by Dave Brockie Experience
- "Diarrhea", a song by Da Yoopers on the 1989 album Yoop It Up

== Television ==
- Daria Morgendorffer, a Beavis and Butthead character (nickname: Diarrhea)

== See also ==
- Category:Diarrhea ( 29 )
- Defecation
- Shit, a word originally referring to diarrhea
