= Lust In Space – Live At The National =

Lust in Space Live at the National

Video by Gwar
- Released: June 26, 2010
- Recorded: October 23, 2009 at The National in Richmond, Virginia
- Genre: Heavy metal, thrash metal
- Length: 82 minutes
- Label: Slave Pit Inc. Hypereal Productions
- Producer: Don Drakulich

Gwar video chronology
Beyond Hell Live (2007)	Lust in Space; Live at the National (2010)	Electile Disfunction '08 (2013)

Lust in Space – Live at the National is a live DVD by the American heavy metal band Gwar, recorded at The National theater in Richmond, Virginia on October 23, 2009, during the band's Lust in Space tour. It was released on June 26, 2010, under Don Drakulich's Hypereal Productions label. Bonuses include a 10-minute "Behind The Murder" mockumentary.

== Track listing ==
1. "Metal Metal Land"
2. "Saddam a Go-Go"
3. "Lords and Masters"
4. "The Apes of Wrath"
5. "Tormentor"
6. "Where is Zog?"
7. "Womb With a View"
8. "Let Us Slay"
9. "Maggots"
10. "Immortal Corruptor"
11. "The Price of Peace"
12. "Lust in Space"
13. "Bring Back the Bomb"
14. "Have You Seen Me?"
15. "Sick of You"

== Personnel ==
- Dave Brockie (Oderus Urungus) – lead vocals
- Cory Smoot (Flattus Maximus) – lead guitar, backing vocals
- Mike Derks (Balsac the Jaws of Death) – rhythm guitar, backing vocals
- Casey Orr (Beefcake the Mighty) – bass, backing vocals, lead vocals on "The Price of Peace"
- Brad Roberts (Jizmak Da Gusha) – drums, percussion
