= Sleazy P. Martini =

Fictional drug trafficker

Sleazy P. Martini is a character played by American artist, filmmaker, musician, performance artist, writer Don Drakulich in the heavy metal band Gwar. He wears two oversized gold necklaces, one with a dollar symbol, and one with a skull and crossbones, a large pompadour, a bright purple suit, and is often seen wielding a sawed-off shotgun. In the Gwar mythos, Sleazy is their manager, the musician who taught them to play their instruments and the main influence in getting them addicted to crack.

== Role in the Gwar mythos ==
=== Discovery of Gwar ===
While fleeing the U.S. on possible drug charges, Sleazy ends up crashing his helicopter in Antarctica, where Gwar has been imprisoned by The Master, frozen inside a cavern. Sleazy stumbles into the cavern and, upon removing his fur coat to reveal a shiny suit that reflects the sun's rays, he inadvertently frees the members of Gwar by melting the ice in which Gwar are imprisoned. Gwar is preparing to kill him when Balsac the Jaws of Death convinces them to ally with Sleazy due to a prophecy about the excellence of whoever would free Gwar. (The decision to join Sleazy was made easier thanks to Sleazy giving them crack cocaine, for which they developed an instant affinity). He teaches the band to play their instruments and brings them to America. These events are recounted in a flashback in Skulhedface. Sleazy also hosts a television show and movie called "It's Sleazy".

The debut of Sleazy is a story of some debate but Drakulich was kind enough to share while talking to Mr. Lobo. Originally, but not canon in the band lore, Drakulich volunteered to play a character that would replace Gwar's first manager - Sleazy's dead brother Sluggo. Sleazy came on stage holding Sluggo's dead body. Drakulich did not realize until much later how much Andy Kauffman character Tony Clifton influenced his performances.

=== Phallus in Wonderland ===
Sleazy plays an important role in the 1992 Gwar film Phallus in Wonderland, as he assists them in the battle against The Morality Squad. Sleazy goes head to head with C.I.A. special agent Cerutti Fancypants, as the two produce larger and more elaborate firearms to one-up each other whilst killing bystanders. Of the Morality Squad, the CIA agent is the only one to not be seen dying.

=== Skulhedface ===
Sleazy returns in the film that accompanies 1994's This Toilet Earth, and in addition to recounting the tale of how he discovered Gwar, he is asked by a corrupt record label (which is actually a front for the villain Skulhedface) to sign over the rights to Gwar and then kill them. After signing over the rights and taking the money, Sleazy signals Gwar to enter the boardroom at which point they kill everyone on the directors board except Skulhedface, who escapes to her underground lab. Ultimately, Sleazy is responsible for distracting Gwar long enough to keep them from riding the World Maggot back to The Master to destroy him - which would end his ability to exploit them further.

=== RagNaRok ===
Sleazy has his own track on the album Ragnarok, "Think You Outta Know This", in which he raps about various conspiracies and secrets. On the tour (and the accompanying video/movie) the song is preceded by Sleazy being approached by a pair of aliens, who think he is a representative of Earth and want him to sign over all rights to Earth. As he is about to sign he pulls out his shotgun and kills one of the aliens. He then lets Gwar dispose of the second alien while he performs his song. In the music video for "Surf Of Syn," he drives Gwar to the NASA space station where they hijack a rocket to fight Cardinal Syn.

=== It's Sleazy!/We Kill Everything ===
Although he had no presence on the We Kill Everything tour or album, the movie based on it includes him in a central role. The antics of the tour were reworked in the movie to take place on a Jerry Springer-like talk show which Sleazy hosts, with the audience members consisting largely of former enemies and members of Gwar.

=== Beyond Hell ===
He appears at the end of the album's story in Back In Crack and sends the band a "9-ton crack boulder".

== Recent work ==
Although he stopped touring with the band in 1996, Don Drakulich continued to work with Gwar in sculpting and film-making. In 2006, Sleazy was prominently featured in the Gwar retrospective DVD, Blood Bath and Beyond, and was also mentioned on the album Beyond Hell. During the fall tour supporting Beyond Hell, Drakulich filmed the first few shows, along with various backstage footage, and released it as the DVD, Beyond Hell Live in 2007. The following few months saw a gradual re-emergence of the character, as he came back out on the road during Gwar's "Electile Dysfunction '08" and "Fights of by Spring '09" tours, as well as appearances at various one-off shows and festivals during the summer of 2009, such as the SDCC 2009 "Metal Meltdown" show (in support of the video game Brütal Legend), Germany's Wacken Open Air, and other European festivals.

Drakulich did not return in person at later Gwar shows, but appeared in a pre-show video that was screened every night before the band took the stage. Although Drakulich has once again gone on a touring hiatus, he is still involved with the Slave Pit, not just with production (such as filming and creating the DVD Lust in Space: Live at the National in 2010), but as the Sleazy character as well. Sleazy is still referenced in Gwar's music, such as the song "Gwarnography" from the album Lust in Space. In 2010 he can be seen in the music video for "Zombies, March!" from Bloody Pit of Horror, and could also be seen during Gwar's first performance on Late Night with Jimmy Fallon.

Drakulich has also contributed to the Gwar fansite, Bohab Central, in the form of an "advice column" titled Ask Sleazy, in which he has stated that both he and Chuck Varga (Sexecutioner) haven't ruled out the possibility of touring again.

He appeared with Gwar at the 2014 Gwar-B-Q and Riotfest.

From 2021 until late 2022 Drakulich ran a YouTube channel as the Sleazy character where he uploaded primarily livestreams, speaking with fans answering their questions about life and Gwar, until his channel was removed for YouTube Community Guideline violations. The livestreams had become popular with fans and are hosted every Saturday night, changing from Fridays starting in 2021. He now uploads to Rumble as well as Bitchute.

Since 2015, Drakulich has hosted Sleazy Pictures After Dark, a showcase of exploitation films interspersed with his own commentary on hyperealproductions.com, his official website. Along with film projects Drakulich custom makes products such as swords, armor, bobbleheads, and resin kits.

== Other references ==
The 1994 song "Pink Elephant" by Oregon ska-swing band the Cherry Poppin' Daddies references Sleazy P. Martini as the owner of the song's titular seedy nightclub.
