= Songs for the Wrong =

Studio album by Dave Brockie Experience
- Released: July 15, 2003
- Recorded: Karma Studios, Richmond, Virginia
- Genre: Punk rock
- Length: 41:39
- Label: Metal Blade

Dave Brockie Experience chronology
Live From Ground Zero (2001)	Songs for the Wrong (2003)

Songs for the Wrong is the second and final studio album by the Dave Brockie Experience, released on July 15. 2003.

== Reception ==
Allmusic's Eduardo Rivadavia mainly commented on the song titles and lyrics, concluding that "if approached with an open mind and a teenage maturity level, Songs for the Wrong guarantees a good time, if not necessarily great music".

NUVO opined that Songs for the Wrong was "easily worth your $13", mostly owing to its lyrics that "border on hysterical and downright stupid (I mean that as a compliment)". "Most of Songs for the Wrong has that feel-good quality that’s synonymous with the Diarrhea of a Madman release, but a few of the tracks fall short of even B-side quality".

Rough Edge noted that there were also serious songs on the record, namely "Shatila" and "Churchmouse in the Snow". Brockie's inclusion of such songs served "to really hammer his bizarreness home". The rest of the lyrics were "sick, but hilarious" and the music "twisted, loose and dark".

== Track listing ==
No.	Title	Length
1.	"Damn that Money"	2:13
2.	"Slowpoke"	2:33
3.	"Should the Ugly Girl Blow Me?"	2:52
4.	"The Chinese Have No Cheese"	2:38
5.	"Music is Like Beer"	0:44
6.	"Hard for a 'Tard"	2:53
7.	"I Wanna Be a Squirrel"	2:10
8.	"Shatilla"	1:30
9.	"He's Going Crazy!"	2:57
10.	"Make Money off Your Friends"	0:58
11.	"Dog Log"	2:46
12.	"Slips of Paper"	2:07
13.	"March of the Faggot Soldiers"	3:04
14.	"Hey Buddy"	1:22
15.	"Medieval Werewolf"	3:57
16.	"Churchmouse in the Snow"	4:03
17.	"Isn't it Grand Boys?"	2:55

== Production ==
- Recorded by Adam Green
- Mixed by Grant Rutledge
- Mastered by Gary Longest
