= Colette Miller =

American visual artist and performer

- Born: United States
- Known for: street art, humanitarianism, performance
- Movement: street art, performance
- Website: colettemiller.com

Colette Miller is an American visual artist and performer. She currently lives in Los Angeles. Miller is best known for creating the Global Angel Wings project in 2012 and as a performer in the heavy metal band Gwar during its formative years between 1986–1987 Colette created the interactive street art project the GlobalAngelWingsProject ( www.globalangelwingsproject.com ) in 2012 "To Remind Humanity that We are the Angels of this Earth". Miller has created and installed angel wings in countries and cities ranging from Kenya to Mexico to Cuba to Australia, Dubai, Moscow, Europe Japan, China earning her international and critical renown. In 2015, an image of a soldier walking in front of the artist's wings in Juarez, Mexico, was featured in Reuters and BBC News as the international photograph of the day. In 2022 she appeared on the ABC show To Tell The Truth.

== Early history ==
Miller's mother grew up in Holland and Indonesia and her father in the United States. They lived many states and places growing up from North Carolina, Hawaii, Massachusetts, Maryland and Washington DC, and built their own house designed by their father. As a result, the artist has always been globally aware and engaged in international dialogues.

== Gwar (1986–1987) ==
While Miller was studying fine art at Virginia Commonwealth University, a group of local art students formed the now infamous punk metal band Gwar, shortly after which Miller became a member. The economic climate of the Reagan administration was starting to instill rebellion in the younger arts community and Gwar was a byproduct of that time. 1986 and 1987, Miller performed in the band under the names "Gwar Girl or Woman" and "Amazina." This character she developed was an empowered female warrior unlike the sexualized woman stereotype that was prevalent during the 1980s.

At the time, the formative band members were living in an old dairy plant that had been converted into lofts and artists studios which they called "The Milk Bottle". It was, as Miller describes, "a huge castle brimming with creative energy."

During her time performing with Gwar, Miller participated in several iconic skits, including: creating a giant RAID can to exterminate the only surviving creature from the Chernobyl nuclear accident in the USSR: a giant cockroach; a commercial for Gwar cereal; and an ironic installation featured around an oversized pair of Adolf Hitler's underwear.

== The Global Angel Wings Project (2012–ongoing) ==
Miller moved to Los Angeles in 1999 and began her Global Angel Wings Project in 2012 to "remind humanity that we are the angels on this Earth." One day she was depressed and stuck in gridlock freeway traffic and began to imagine how much better the sterile buildings around her would be with angel wings on them. The idea behind the wings was not specifically because she was living in Los Angeles, nicknamed the City of Angels, but was more about creating something uplifting for humanity as a whole.

Miller selects neighborhoods throughout the world that need some moral uplifting since, as she explains, "the image of wings as enlightenment, hope, freedom, purity, and flight would be a good thing people to see and be a part of." The Divine in Humanity.

Miller installs her wings at eye-level, encouraging viewers to interact with the design and step in between them. This has launched an outpouring on social media with people taking photographs of themselves in various poses as the angel in between her wings. Miller has been included in lists of "The Most Instagram-Worthy Spots in L.A." on BuzzFeed and Los Angeles Magazine, among others.

=== TEDx Talk ===
In 2015, Miller delivered a TEDx Talk entitled "Are We the Angels of the Earth?" in Culver City, California.
