= Rendezvous with Ragnarok =

Rendezvous with RagNaRok

Video by Gwar
- Released: 1997
- Recorded: 1997
- Genre: Thrash metal, Shock rock
- Length: 60 min
- Label: Metal Blade
- Director: Hunter Jackson, Dave Brockie, Don Drakulich
- Producer: Slave Pit, Inc.

Gwar chronology
| Return of Techno-Destructo (1996) | Rendezvous with RagNaRok (1997) | Surprising Burst of Chocolaty Fudge (1998) |

Professional ratings
Review scores
| Source | Rating |
|---|---|
| Allmusic | 3/5 stars |

Rendezvous with RagNaRok is a performance film by the band Gwar coinciding with their 1995 studio album RagNaRok, though the video was released in early 1997 (much of the footage was from 1996). The bulk of the video is concert footage, with a mock interview interspersed between each song. Additionally, three music videos - "Saddam a Go-Go," "Meat Sandwich," and "Surf of Syn" - are among the scenes.

== Movie concept ==
The main concept of the movie is that a paranormal investigator, Mason Temple (played by Bob Gorman), is interrogating Gwar members about the coming of the comet RagNaRok. Flattus Maximus, Beefcake the Mighty, a dis-armed Techno Destructo and Balsac the Jaws of Death offer accounts as to exactly what happened in the concerts. During the concert, grey aliens come and take a sperm sample of Oderus Urungus for reasons yet unknown. With this sperm sample, they inseminate Slymenstra Hymen, who gives birth further into the show. After giving birth (with the "Fire In The Loins" footage), the infant is abducted by Synnite warriors, who announce the coming of Cardinal Syn. Their reason for abducting the newborn is not revealed until Syn arrives - Cardinal Syn is a robot, powered by the soul of an infant with a high level of Jizmoglobin (previously mentioned in Skulhedface). With Syn's arrival, the band is utterly defeated, until they are finally able to (literally) disarm the robot, and open his chest cavity (which reveals his power source).

The video for "Surf of Syn" has a different fate for both Gwar and Syn. At the end, Syn's body is destroyed (by the craft that brought him to Earth; Techno Destrcuto hijacks it and rams it into the body), but his head fires lasers at Gwar, incapacitating them long enough to get away.

== Music used ==
Though there is live footage, the music used is lifted directly from the album, with two exceptions ("Sonderkommando," a song from This Toilet Earth, is a live version, with differing lyrics than the one found on the album, and "S.F.W.," a song written and recorded for the soundtrack to the eponymous film, is also live).

== Music videos ==
"Saddam a Go-Go" was used in a later episode of Beavis and Butt-head, and was highly praised (it is generally assumed that Gwar is Beavis and Butt-head's favorite band). Though from This Toilet Earth, the entire video uses footage from the 1994 tour, and was unable to be used in the Skulhedface movie.

"Meat Sandwich" is credited (on the Ultimate Video Gwarchive) as directed by Abe Spear, but credited as being directed by Dave Brockie in Rendezvous with RagNaRok. The meat-eating scene at the end made a number of extras ill, as they actually ate the (undercooked) meat (Brockie and Gorman claim to have instructed them to act like they were eating it, and they didn't listen).

"Surf of Syn" was the first video for the album, and was filmed on a very, very small budget. It features the X-Cops, except for "Zipper Pig" (Gorman). Matt Maguire plays Cardinal Syn in the video (and in the song).

== Miscellaneous ==
Flattus Maximus speaks more in this video than in any other recording to date. It is also the only footage with Peter Lee speaking as Flattus; the character was played by two extras (Lee was recovering from a gunshot wound) in Skulhedface, and Flattus and JiZMak never said anything during Dawn of the Day of the Night of the Penguins.
