= The Animated Tales of Gwar =

2013 animated cartoon by Myke Chilian featuring heavy metal band Gwar

The Animated Tales Of Gwar is a 2013 one-reel animated cartoon produced by Myke Chilian and the heavy metal band Gwar. It was released online by Funny Or Die Cartoons.

== Plot ==
=== New song ===
The short opens with Gwar performing "Bring Back The Bomb" at a venue. Oderus then announces that they have a new song for "all you kids". He then pulls up a stool and plays an acoustic guitar and sings about putting stuff away. This incites fury from the audience. (With one audience member throwing a beer bottle at Oderus, but hitting Jizmak instead.) When the other band members confront him on the matter, he says he's tired of the violent image the band puts out and wants to make them a children's band, utilizing "education through positive music". The others are shocked at this revelation.

=== Doctor ===
When Pustulus asks if he's high, Oderus says he is indeed high, on life. Beefcake says they need a doctor. The doctor diagnoses Oderus' condition as "lead singer menopause", an illness that turns people into children's performers. He goes on to say that the cure rests in the highest mountaintops of Antarctica, and that once obtained, it can return Oderus to his regular objectionable self. The doctor wishes them good luck as he goes to use the bathroom. Gwar leaves the room to get the cure while Oderus stays behind to censor Gwar's merchandise.

=== Birthday party ===
In another room, Weird Al Yankovic is talking with someone on the phone about performing at a kid's birthday party. Oderus listens in on the conversation and expresses desire to trade places with Weird Al. At that moment, he gets an idea. When Weird Al sees him, he expresses joy at meeting his idol, which quickly turns to horror as Oderus assaults him.

Meanwhile, Gwar is climbing an Antarctic mountain where Jizmak suffers a stream of bad luck. (Getting a piece of Beefcake's armor stuck in his eye, getting a pickaxe stuck in his leg by a texting Balsac, getting a second pickaxe stuck in his head by Beefcake, who then throws him at the mountain summit, releasing an undead Tyrannosaurus rex.)

Meanwhile, Oderus stops at the birthday party Weird Al was to appear at, wearing Weird Al's face and hair like a mask. He is able to fool the family and get in. Back in Antarctica, Gwar is doing battle with the undead dinosaur when the doctor appears in Beefcake's subconscious and reveals that the cure for Oderus' affliction is in the dinosaur's blood. At that moment, the dinosaur attacks and eats the doctor before getting its head sliced off by Beefcake.

Back at the party, Oderus is failing to win the children's favor, with a girl stating that kids like "gross out humor". At that moment, Weird Al's face slides off, revealing Oderus' true identity. Then, Gwar bursts in and Beefcake injects the cure into Oderus' head, which returns him to normal, to the delight of his bandmates. The band then celebrates by slaughtering everybody at the party.

=== Post credits ===
In a post-credits scene, Weird Al is met with upset reactions from the audience and fails to get them happy, swearing revenge on Gwar for ruining him.
