= Dead Earth Politics =

American heavy metal rock band

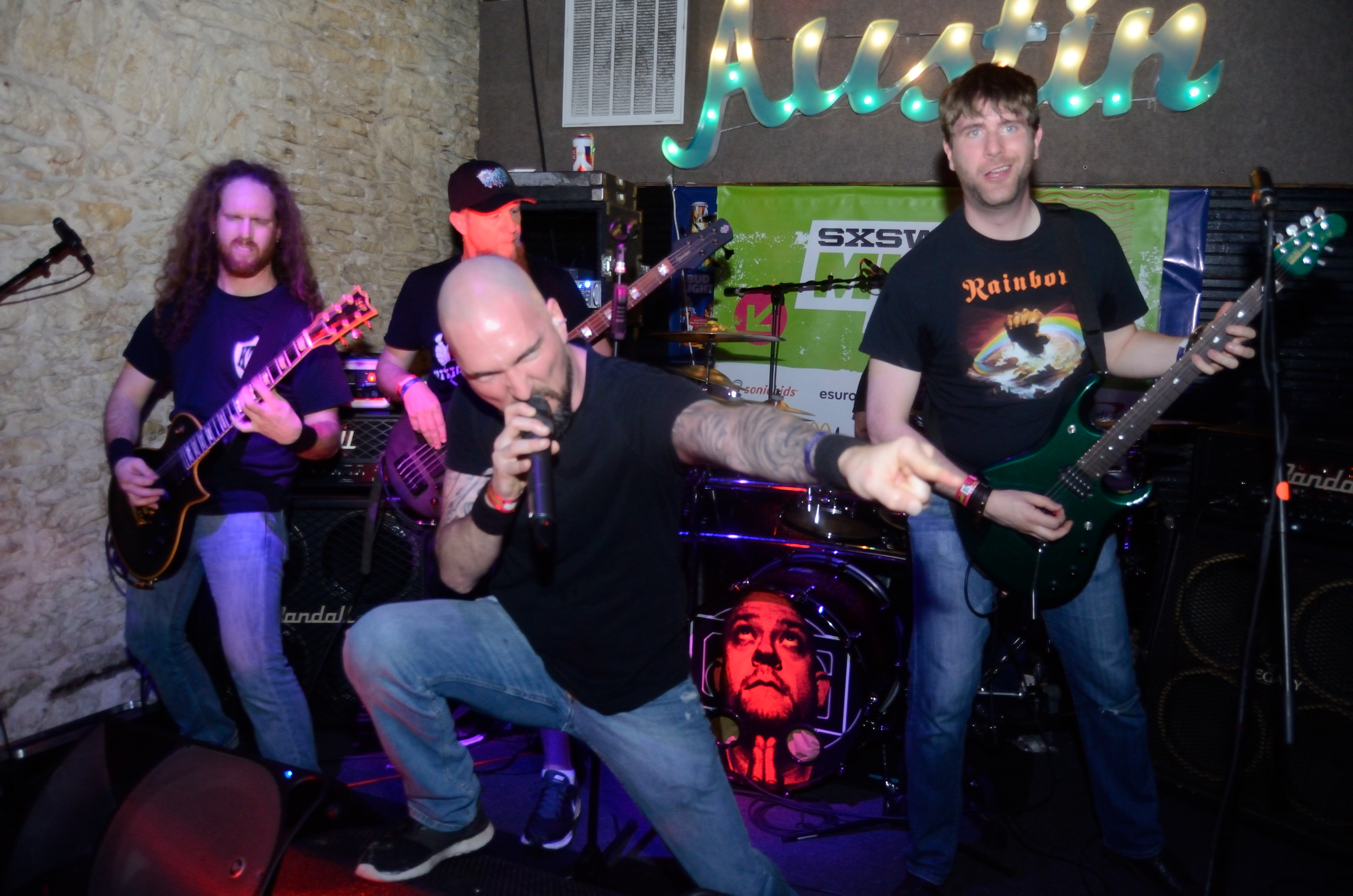
- Dead Earth Politics in Austin, TX 2016

Background information
- Origin: Austin, Texas, United States
- Genres: Thrash Metal, Heavy Metal, Power Progressive Thrash
- Years active: 2005-2017
- Labels: Genuine Recordings, Self
- Members: Ven Scott, Aaron Canady, Tim Driscoll, Lennis Hayes
- Past members: Paul Rosalez, Craig Rundels, Mason Evans, Will Little
- Website: www.deadearthpolitics.com

Dead Earth Politics was an American heavy metal rock band formed in Austin, Texas in 2005. The band's final line up consisted of Ven Scott, Tim Driscoll, Lennis Hayes and Aaron Canady. The group rose to prominence in the mid-to-late 2000s, and they went on to release one studio album and three EPs. Their final project – the EP Men Become Gods – was released on March 14, 2015.

== History ==
=== Formation ===
The band was originally formed in Austin, Texas in 2003 by Ernie Clark, Will Little, Mason Evans and Paul Rosales, under another name. In 2005, the quartet began auditioning vocalists, and narrowed it down to two individuals. Ven Scott was the second choice, but after their first choice went to jail, Evans called Brown back and offered him the position. After a few shows, they decided to change the band name to Dead Earth Politics, a name that Evans conceived. The band began as quoted by Ven “as a bunch of idiots who thought we could eliminate stress in our lives through art”.

=== Debut and early years ===
Mark the Resistance was the first EP release of Dead Earth Politics' career, released in 2006. Five years later, "The Weight of Poseidon" was released as their first full-length album released on iTunes on March 29, 2010. The album was defined by its riff-heavy rock and mixed dirty and clean vocals, with 10.13 emerging as a fan favorite. Reviewer R. Scott Bolton from Metal Edge described the album as "an explosive sound with enough variety to hold your attention throughout."

Tim, fresh from Berklee university, joined the band in 2012 and met together on Craigslist. Aaron, originally guitar player from the band Shrapnel, joined in 2014 creating the “band that the people envisioned” according to Ven.

=== 2012 – 2015 ===
After four years of near silence, Dead Earth Politics released the first of a three EP series, The Queen of Steel. The Queen of Steel is Dead Earth Politics’ second EP release of their career, with three songs featured on the album, those being “Redneck Dragon Slayer”, “The Queen of Steel”, and “Madness of the Wanderer”. The EP was released on iTunes on March 1, 2014.

Men Become Gods was released on iTunes on March 14, 2015. The EP includes four songs, “Casting Stones”, “Men Become Gods”, “Ice & Fire”, and “Crimson Dichotomy”. This EP is the second of the EP series, following up their “The Queen of Steel” EP.

Dead Earth Politics was a part of the SXSW lineup in Austin, TX in March 2014. The band was accompanied by the following bands: The Launderettes, Kay Leotard, Complete, Hellbenders, AEGES, and Fresno.

In May 2014, Dead Earth Politics was personally invited to play the first Rock the Heart tribute to Mike Scaccia in Austin, TX. Dead Earth Politics played alongside Warbeast and Down.

Band has been a part of Synsane Radio's Austin Autism Society Benefit twice.

In October 2013, Dead Earth Politics was also invited to perform at the Housecore Horror Film Festival in Austin, TX. The festival includes film showcases of various forms of horror films, as well as three nights of the “heaviest music on the planet”. Dead Earth Politics was invited back for the 2015 film festival.

The band also made its return to SXSW in 2015, soon after their release of the Men Become Gods EP. They performed in Austin's local Dirty Dog Bar with Excessum, Venomous Maximus, Unlocking the Truth, Royal Thunder, and Betrayal.

Their most recent milestone was being invited to play the 30th anniversary party for Gwar at their annual Gwar B-Q in Richmond, VA, August 16, 2015.

=== 2017 ===
In 2017, remaining members Ven, Tim and Aaron laid the band to rest. This is confirmed in an interview with enFocus Magazine where Ven confirms, "It was clear to both Tim and I (and at the time, Aaron Canady as well) that Dead Earth Politics had run its course." This is further confirmed on Scott's own website as well as the Dead Earth Politics homepage where an image appears of the final line up and the text "2005 - 2017".

== Members ==
Member	Role	Years
Ven Scott	Lead Vocals	2005 - 2017
Mason Evans	Drums/Vocals	2005 - 2017
Tim Driscoll	Lead Guitar/Vocals	2012 - 2017
Aaron Canady	Rhythm Guitar/Vocals	2013 - 2017
Lennis Hayes	Bass Guitar	2017 - 2017
Will Little	Bass Guitar	2005 - 2016
Ernie Clark	Lead Guitar/Vocals	2005–2012
Craig Rundels	Guitar	2012–2013
Paul Rosales	Guitar	2005–2006

== Discography ==
Album	Track listing	Year	Notes
Mark the Resistance (E.P.)	1. By Design; 2. Whisper Diseases; 3. A Thousand More; 4. Festive Gathering; 5. Blackmoon Rises	2006	Mark the Resistance was the first EP release of Dead Earth Politics career, released in 2006. The EP was officially released on iTunes on January 1, 2009.
The Weight of Poseidon (L.P.)	1. Artistic License; 2. Dos Cuerpos; 3. Burial Ground; 4. Once Was Glass; 5. Hooked; 6. The Weight of Poseidon; 7. Traitor is a Name; 8. 10/13	2010	The Weight of Poseidon is Dead Earth Politics’ first full-length album released on iTunes on March 29, 2010.
The Queen of Steel (E.P.)	1. Redneck Dragonslayer; 2. The Queen of Steel; 3. Madness of the Wanderer	2014	After four years of near silence, Dead Earth Politics released the first of a three EP series, The Queen of Steel. The Queen of Steel is Dead Earth Politics’ second EP release of their career and the first of a three E.P. series, with three songs featured on the album.
Men Become Gods (E.P.)	1. Casting Stones; 2. Men Become Gods; 3. Ice & Fire; 4. Crimson Dichotomy	2015	Men Become Gods was released on iTunes on March 14, 2015 and is the second of their three E.P. series that began with "The Queen of Steel".

== Tours ==
As noted above, Dead Earth Politics was invited to perform at 6th annual Gwar-B-Q festival. In addition to this and as means of celebrating Gwar's 30th anniversary, Dead Earth Politics, Gwar and Metal injection teamed up to create "The Road to Gwar-B-Q". This was a tour where Dead Earth Politics chronicled on video their exploits leading up to the Gwar-B-Q festival and celebrating Gwar's birthday. The dates and videos are below:

- August 5, 2015 - Houston, TX - Video
- August 7, 2015 - San Antonio, TX - Video
- August 8, 2015 - Austin, TX - Video
- August 9, 2015 - Lafayette, LA - Video
- August 12, 2015 - Montgomery, AL - Video
- August 13, 2015 - Albany, GA - Video
- August 15, 2015 - Richmond, VA - Gwar-B-Q

== Awards ==
- Austin Chronicle's Best Performing Metal Band 2012
- Austin Chronicle's Best Performing Metal Band 2013
- Austin Chronicle's Best Performing Metal Band 2014
- Ultimate Local Music Worldwide's Track of the Year - “Redneck Dragonslayer”

== New Projects ==
Immediately after the dissolution of Dead Earth Politics, Ven Scott and Tim Driscoll formed Runescarred. As Driscoll mentions in an interview with enFocus Magazine, the music in Runescarred differs from Dead Earth Politics in that it is "like a prizefighter getting lean and dropping a weight class. It is a more melodic and expansive sound, no less heavy but not quite as claustrophobic." According to his website, Ven continues management duties with Runescarred as well.

According to Runescarred's website, their first E.P. will be due out in June 2018.
