= Stephen Sphincter =

- Birth name: Ron Curry
- Genres: Punk rock Shock rock
- Occupation: Guitarist
- Instrument: Guitar
- Years active: 1986–1987
- Labels: Metal Blade Records; DRT Entertainment; Slave Pit Inc.
- Website: Gwar official site

Stephen Sphincter was an early Gwar character, played by Ron Curry, who then recorded six albums on SST Records with Hotel X. His on-stage brother was Hans Sphincter, played by drummer Jim Thompson.
