= Diarrhea of a Madman =

Studio album by Dave Brockie Experience
- Released: March 20, 2001
- Recorded: Summer 2000, Richmond, Virginia, U.S.
- Genre: Punk rock
- Length: 56:37
- Label: Metal Blade
- Producer: Dave Brockie; Mike Derks; Adam Green

Dave Brockie Experience chronology
Diarrhea of a Madman (2001)	Live From Ground Zero (2001)

Diarrhea of a Madman is the debut album by the band Dave Brockie Experience. It was released in 2001 by Metal Blade Records.

== Reception ==
Houston Press described the album as "an entertaining mix of the leader’s musings on the world" and "liberally applied doses of not-altogether-gratuitous poo-poo and masturbation humor". Still, the songs often contained a resonance of truth "just one layer down". Standing out from the rest, the tracks "I Saw Three Forms" and "Calling Dr. Fong" were lengthy renditions of a dramatic dialogue set to background music, a "type of free-form-storytelling-to-music rarely heard since Apostrophe-era Zappa".

Razorcake wrote in extenso: "Schizophrenic, vaguely poppy rock music with some pretty stupid lyrics, from one of the guys responsible for Gwar, which explains quite a bit". New Music Monthly stated that "when DBX rocks, it's nothing short of tasteless mayhem", fulfilling the band's intent with this record.

Rough Edge opined that Diarrhea of a Madman "is certainly entertaining, as long as you don't have a politically correct bone in your body". This was due to the "shocking, outrageous and uncensored" lyrics as well as liner notes. However, "many will find the over-the-top antics of the Dave Brockie Experience too much". Ink 19 compared the album to "Mr. Bungle covering the Joykiller", which was a "weird, wild ride" to sit through.

== Track listing ==
No.	Title	Length
1.	"40,000 Times"	1:36
2.	"Too Much Stuff"	1:41
3.	"You Want to Suck My Dick"	3:10
4.	"Pants"	1:06
5.	"Faggot on Fire"	1:53
6.	"Helium Creed"	1:09
7.	"Beat Stall"	1:11
8.	"The Dance of Europe"	2:17
9.	"Iranian Masturbator"	4:14
10.	"Washing Yourself"	4:25
11.	"Servant of Death's Head"	1:57
12.	"Two Smart Guys Fight (About Michelangelo)"	1:26
13.	"The Pennington Lark"	0:50
14.	"I Clean up Real Good"	1:27
15.	"Great News!"	3:31
16.	"Masturbate"	1:08
17.	"I Saw Three Forms"	5:04
18.	"Calling Dr. Fong"	18:33

- Lady Died (live) (hidden track)- 15:15 into track 18.
