= Dave Brockie Experience =

American rock band

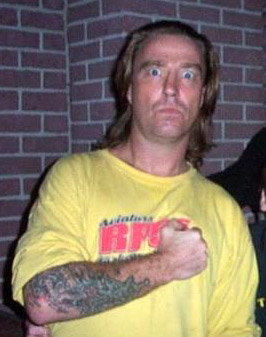
- Lead singer/Bassist Dave Brockie

Background information
- Origin: Richmond, Virginia
- Genres: Punk rock, comedy rock, thrash metal, experimental rock
- Years active: 2001-2012
- Labels: Metal Blade Records
- Spinoff of: Gwar
- Members: Dave Brockie; Mike Derks; Brad Roberts

The Dave Brockie Experience or DBX was a rock band formed by three members of heavy metal band Gwar. The band was composed of David "Oderus Urungus" Brockie (vocals/bass), Brad "Jizmak Da Gusha" Roberts (drums), and Mike "Balsac the Jaws of Death" Derks (guitar).

The DBX was a pet project of Gwar and showed some of their earlier punk roots from the "Death Piggy" era. At their shows they played some original DBX songs as well as some tunes from Death Piggy, Gwar, and X-Cops. The band enjoyed a following mostly made up of Gwar fans. Brockie hinted at the possibility of the band's breakup in the past due to the exhausting nature of lower-budget touring.

In February 2008, several sources reported that the band would be touring as an opening act for the reunited Green Jellÿ. Dave Brockie stated on his website that this was not the case and there were no official discussions concerning the tour. DBX played two reunion shows in August 2009.

Brockie died of a heroin overdose on March 23, 2014.

== Discography ==
- Diarrhea of a Madman
- Live From Ground Zero
- Songs for the Wrong
- Hanging Out at the Pound (DVD)
