= Battle Maximus =

Studio album by Gwar
- Released: September 17, 2013
- Genre: Thrash metal
- Length: 51:21
- Label: Metal Blade
- Producer: John Angelo

Gwar chronology
Bloody Pit of Horror (2010)	Battle Maximus (2013)	The Blood of Gods (2017)

Battle Maximus is the thirteenth studio album by American heavy metal band Gwar. The album was released on September 17, 2013 through Metal Blade Records.

The album features several personnel changes. New members include guitarist Brent Purgason (of Cannabis Corpse) portraying the new character Pustulus Maximus, while new bassist Jamison Land portrays longtime character, Beefcake the Mighty. This is the final album with vocalist Dave Brockie who portrayed Oderus Urungus, due to Brockie's death from a heroin overdose on March 23, 2014.

The album was re-released September 1, 2023 as a special "10th Anniversary Edition". The re-release features completely new mixes of the album as well as the previously unreleased track "Tammy, the Swine Queen", which is the last song recorded by Brockie before his death.

== Overview ==
The album's description reads:

"Battle Maximus" was conceived and recorded over the last year at the bands self-operated Slave Pit Studios, and was mixed by veteran metal producer Glen Robinson and mastered by the matchless Howie Weinberg. It features twelve brand-new tracks of sonic sedition guaranteed to make even the most hardened GWAR fans head explode, merely by looking at the packaging. With songs like "Madness at the Core of Time", "Torture", and "They Swallowed the Sun", the album not only tells the next chapter in the never-ending story of GWAR, but also stands as a tribute to the band's long-time guitar player, the incomparable Flattus Maximus, who left Earth and returned to the cosmos to fulfill his glorious destiny almost two years ago.

Rather than attempt to emulate the un-matchable sound of Flattus, who had led the band from the depths of clown-rock to the elite tier of top-notch metal acts with a series of bone-crushing recordings starting with 2000's "Violence Has Arrived", Oderus and company struck out in a bold new direction. Enlisting the aid of Pustulus Maximus, cousin of Flattus, who wrested the right to join forces with GWAR after waging the epic "Battle Maximus", GWAR has created one of their most awe-inspiring albums to date, one that is sure to join the ranks of "Scumdogs of the Universe" and "Lust in Space", as the ultimate expressions of GWAR's contempt for modern society and the hypocrisy and horror of a world gone mad.

Get ready, human scum...GWAR is coming...all over your face!"

The album features several guest guitarists on the title track, each under a new Maximus character. Zach Blair, who portrayed Flattus Maximus before Cory Smoot, provides additional guitar on several songs as the character Splattus Maximus. Todd Evans, a former Beefcake the Mighty, also appears as Skookum Maximus.

== Track listing ==
No.	Title	Length
1.	"Intro"	1:55
2.	"Madness at the Core of Time"	3:30
3.	"Bloodbath"	3:27
4.	"Nothing Left Alive"	4:04
5.	"They Swallowed the Sun"	4:56
6.	"Torture"	4:47
7.	"Raped at Birth"	3:59
8.	"I, Bonesnapper" (Vocals by Bonesnapper)	4:02
9.	"Mr. Perfect"	5:35
10.	"Battle Maximus" (Instrumental)	3:38
11.	"Triumph of the Pig Children"	3:50
12.	"Falling"	2:49
13.	"Fly Now"	4:49
14.	"Carry on Wayward Son" (Kansas cover, European bonus track)	5:00
15.	"Wheel of Punishment" (European bonus track)	2:28

== Personnel ==
=== Gwar ===
- Dave "Oderus Urungus" Brockie - lead vocals
- Brent "Pustulus Maximus" Purgason - lead guitar, backing vocals
- Mike "Bälsäc the Jaws O Death" Derks - rhythm guitar, backing vocals
- Jamison "Beefcake the Mighty" Land - bass, backing vocals
- Brad "Jizmak Da Gusha" Roberts - drums, percussion

=== Additional musicians ===
- Bob "Bonesnapper" Gorman - lead vocals on "I, Bonesnapper"
- Zach "Splattus Maximus” Blair - additional guitar on "Intro", "Bloodbath", "Torture", "Raped at Birth", "Battle Maximus", and "Falling"
- Todd "Skookum Maximus" Evans - additional guitar on "Battle Maximus", and "Nothing Left Alive"
- Old "Twatticus Maximus" Drake - additional guitar on "Battle Maximus"
- Mark "Tyrone Der Teufel" Morton - additional guitar on "Battle Maximus"
- Jenna "Jadis Valkyrja" Anderson - additional vocals on "They Swallowed The Sun" and "Carry On"

=== Production ===
- John Angelo - production / recording
- Glen Robinson - mixing
- Howie Weinberg - mastering
