= Beyond Hell =

Studio album by Gwar
- Released: August 29, 2006
- Recorded: April – August 2006
- Studios: Slave Pit Studios, Richmond, Virginia, and Devin Townsend Studios, Vancouver, British Columbia, Canada
- Genres: Thrash metal, comedy rock
- Length: 46:46
- Label: DRT Entertainment
- Producers: Gwar; Devin Townsend

Gwar chronology
Live from Mt. Fuji (2005)	Beyond Hell (2006)	Lust in Space (2009)

Professional ratings
Review scores
Source	Rating
Allmusic	2.5/5 stars
Punknews.org	4/5 stars

Beyond Hell is the tenth studio album by American heavy metal band Gwar. Released on August 29, 2006, by DRT Entertainment, the album was originally announced through the band's official website on February 23, 2006. Unlike the band's output since 2001, it is a concept album and a rock opera, centering on Gwar's journey to Hell as they escape from the attacking armies of humanity.

== Overview ==
The concept of this album is the closest thing to a rock opera that Gwar has done since RagNaRok. The concept revolves around the band's journey to hell and their epic battle with the devil. The album follows the sound Gwar set with Violence Has Arrived and perfected with War Party.

The album had previously been tentatively titled Go To Hell! and Greetings From Hell!. Beyond Hell is one of the two albums by Gwar to have no other lead vocalist than Oderus Urungus (the other is Violence Has Arrived).

A single for Gwar's cover of Alice Cooper's song "School's Out" was released for radio play before the release of the album, and a video for it was shot in August, premiering on MTV's Headbangers Ball on August 19.

Beyond Hell was produced by Devin Townsend of Strapping Young Lad (who also provided backing vocals in "Tormentor") and Cory Smoot. The album was demo'd and recorded in Smoot's personal recording studio (christened SlavePit Studios) with the exception of Dave Brockie's vocals, which were done in Vancouver at Devin Townsend's studio.

The album is available as a regular CD or in a limited digipack format, which also includes a bonus DVD with various extras on it plus expanded artwork and a poster. The DVD features behind-the-scenes clips featuring a tour of the "Slave Pit" which is where all the costumes are made, and stored, as well as a short called "Meeting Dave Brockie" where the producers meet the man behind the Oderus mask, as well as mockumentary footage of producer Devin Townsend (whose name is misspelled "Townshend") meeting the band for the first time. The DVD was produced by metal producers Metal Injection, who included a bonus sketch of Russian journalist "Metal" Misha crashing a Gwar recording session.

== Concept ==
Ever since the announcement of the release of Beyond Hell (then known as Go to Hell), the album's main theme has been known. As quoted from an announcement on Gwar.net: "[Beyond Hell] concerns Gwar’s epic journey into the tunnels and caverns that honeycomb your world, a journey not only to escape their earthly prison "from within", but also to find and confront this so-called "Satan", who seems to think that he is a bigger bad ass than Oderus. Along the way Gwar encounter's a bevy of demonic dickheads and hapless victims, all ready to die for your entertainment because they're all a bunch of assholes". The line "Abandon All [Your] Hope, Ye Who Enters Here" from Dante Alighieri's Inferno is used in the last verse in "Go To Hell!"

The main outline of the album's plot is told in the lyrics, and it is expanded upon on tour by the band through skits between each song.

The story starts with a theatrical introduction by a narrator-like figure, telling of how the "drunken brothers" of Gwar sleep, unaware of the situation around them. The story then picks up with "War Is All We Know", telling of the attack by the armies of humanity, led by the Nazi Pope on Gwar's Antarctic fortress. While the band manage to put up a defense for a while, eventually they are forced to retire as the enemy army nukes Gwar's castle, forcing them to withdraw to the underground, as is told in "Murderer's Muse".

Lost, looking for a place to escape, they come across Jitler, a cross of Jesus and Adolf Hitler who tells them about how the caverns under Gwar's keep lead into Hell itself. Jitler agrees to lead them to Hell, however, they still get lost along the way. Balsac the Jaws of Death tries using the Hell for Dummies manual to find their way, while Jitler uses Google to find directions. Eventually, they make their way to Hell ("Go to Hell!") but find a very long line at the gates, along with a pig-like demonic police officer beating up people with a club. As explained in the lyrics of "I Love the Pigs", this demon used to be a corrupt policeman while he was alive, involving himself in drug deals until the last one went wrong and he was shot (despite this, the cause of death is said to be suicide by the authorities).

Gwar murder and mutilate the demonic cop and make their way through the gates of Hell, facing the Tormentor (in the eponymous song), whom they also promptly defeat. Gwar next come across the Eight Lock, a prison within Hell keeping some of the biggest evils in the underworld inside. On tour, several demons are released from it and fight Gwar.

The battle isn't over yet, and their next enemy comes off as a parody of decadent rock n roll lifestyle, a drugged-out demon of rock, named Toe E. Namel who, according to the lyrics on the song "Destroyed", killed himself by overdosing on heroin. This enemy is defeated. The story then tells the tale of a nerdy Gwar fan ("The Ultimate Bohab") who became victim of the band's antics yet remained loyal until the very end, committing suicide just to follow Gwar to Hell.

After all of these battles and obstacles, the band makes it to the palace of Satan himself ("The One That Will Not Be Named"), first asking him to open the door, but after getting no answer, smashing through it and calling him out. It is then that the main enemy of the story, Jewcifer (a portmanteau of Jew and Lucifer, intended for satiric effect) appears and fights Gwar, eventually being defeated as Gwar summons Gor-Gor to bite the demon's head off, allowing Gwar to conquer Hell. However, their victory doesn't last long.

Following the defeat of Jewcifer, the band find themselves back at their destroyed fortress ("Back in Crack"), receiving a 9-ton crack boulder from Sleazy P. Martini, and pondering over how meaningless their quest was, as they were left with absolutely nothing but a ruined castle and the knowledge that their adventure at least "was good for some kicks".

=== Characters ===
- Gwar – Main characters in the story, decadent rock band made up of alien war gods banished to Earth
- The Nazi Pope - Attacks Gwar's fortress early in the story; though mentioned in the liner notes and featured on tour (killed during "Immortal Corrupter"), there is no mention of him in any song.
- Jitler - Created by Jesus Christ and Adolf Hitler merging "right at the ass", leads Gwar through Hell and can be considered one of the few characters in the Gwar mythos that is allied to Gwar without being a member of the group (others being the Bonesnapper and Scroda Moon).
- The Pig - A corrupt cop who serves as Hell's resident policeman, first battle in Hell.
- Tormentor - Fought after The Pig, not much is explained about the Tormentor, except that he is some kind of demon guardian. On tour, the song was used during the slaughter of Pres. George W. Bush. He is portrayed by Devin Townsend.
- The Demon of Rock N Roll – A demon who used to be a drug addicted, decadent rock star. His official name is Toe E. Namel.
- The Ultimate Bohab – A Gwar fan who killed himself to follow Gwar to Hell and is actually an enemy on tour (as he would have been in life; Gwar are not particularly fond of their fans). His name is given as Stubbles McGillicutty.
- Jewcifer (He Who Will Not Be Named) – Overlord of Hell, none other than Satan himself and the last enemy Gwar face in their quest. Portrayed by Matt Maguire (MX2, the slave with the knight helmet) both on the album and on tour.
- Sleazy P. Martini – Mentioned only in "Murderer's Muse" and "Back in Crack", he sends Gwar a nine-ton crack boulder at the end of the story; his first appearance in a Gwar album for several years.

== Track listing ==
No.	Title	Length
1.	"Intro"	1:00
2.	"War Is All We Know"	4:40
3.	"Murderer's Muse"	4:18
4.	"Go to Hell!"	4:46
5.	"I Love the Pigs"	4:29
6.	"Tormentor"	4:30
7.	"Eighth Lock"	4:06
8.	"Destroyed"	2:24
9.	"The Ultimate Bohab"	3:53
10.	"The One That Will Not Be Named"	4:06
11.	"Back in Crack"	5:11
12.	"School's Out" (Alice Cooper cover)	3:23

== Personnel ==
- Dave Brockie (Oderus Urungus) – lead vocals
- Cory Smoot (Flattus Maximus) – lead guitar, backing vocals, producer
- Mike Derks (Balsac the Jaws of Death) – rhythm guitar, backing vocals
- Todd Evans (Beefcake the Mighty) – bass, backing vocals
- Brad Roberts (Jizmak Da Gusha) – drums, percussion
- Devin Townsend – producer
- Matt Maguire (normally a slave; Jewcifer on the album) – vocals on "The One That Will Not Be Named"
