= Hell-O =

Album by Gwar

Hell-O!

Studio album by Gwar
- Released: 1988
- Recorded: 1988
- Studio: Noise New York (New York)
- Genre: Hardcore punk
- Length: 38:31
- Labels: Shimmy Disc; S.010.CS (Cassette); SDE 8910/CD 08-025221-10 (CD); Metal Blade; 3984-14004-2, CDZORRO 35 (Remastered CD)
- Producer: Kramer

Gwar chronology
Hell-O! (1988)	Scumdogs of the Universe (1990)

Hell-O! is the debut studio album by American heavy metal band Gwar. It was released in 1988, on Shimmy Disc Records. The album was produced by Kramer.

Gwar's angle on the album is that of a morbid punk band (a la the Mentors, the Misfits, Butthole Surfers) obsessed with debauchery, violence and toilet humor. The songs generally support the theme of the group quite well, expanding the band's concept to comic proportions and supporting the back story.

== Overview ==
The band play sooth-sayers to the United States ("Americanized" and "Ollie North") and modern human civilization in general ("Slutman City"), who have come to torture and enslave Earth for their own perverse sadistic pleasures ("Time For Death", "Bone Meal", "War Toy", "I'm In Love (With a Dead Dog)").

Despite having superpowers, Gwar is not without enemies - a character known as Techno-Destructo has followed the band to Earth to recruit or enslave them to serve "The Master" in a holy jihad against the universe ("Techno's Song"). Don Drakulich plays Techno on the album (the part would soon be taken over by Hunter Jackson). Other songs follow similarly crazy themes - the "Gwar Theme" is a car-eating anthem, "Je M' Appelle J. Cousteau" features famous aquanaut Jacques-Yves Cousteau in a Dada-esque romp, and "AEIOU" disputes whether the English alphabet is the property of Satan or Gor-Gor, another Gwar character who would later surface in the song/video of the same name.

"Rock N' Roll Party Town", the first song ever written by the band, concludes the album in scenes of rock debauchery vaguely reminiscent of Kiss, of whom the band, with their showmanship and larger-than-life personas, seemed to be an 80s underground version. The original vinyl album contained a comic book about the band, featuring artwork parodying Picasso's Guernica (renamed "Gwarnica" here) and poking fun at the "this is your brain on drugs" commercials ("This is your brain on Gwar...").

The album's cover art features the band gleefully terrorizing Earthlings, particularly skinheads, who would attend the band's early shows and harass them with heckling, violence and throwing food, such as toast, onstage, and bulldozing their bodies into ditches.

Musically and conceptually, the record fits in with and came from the arty 80s noise rock or "scum rock" scene (Butthole Surfers, Pussy Galore, early Ween) with similarities to grunge (Tad, Mudhoney), funny punk (Meatmen, Angry Samoans, Dead Milkmen, Happy Flowers, Nig-Heist), punk (The Mentors, The Misfits, Black Flag, Samhain), hardcore (Dead Kennedys, Bad Brains, Ministry) and heavy metal (M.O.D., S.O.D., Slayer).

This last genre would be where the band would move on later releases (similar to the transition Suicidal Tendencies underwent between first and second albums). As such, when the album was released on CD, it was remastered (possibly remixed) to bring out the bass and make the production smoother. However, the original vinyl release finds the band squarely in the punk or indie rock universe. In this context, producer Kramer's work on the album makes sense.

== Release ==
Shimmy Disc released "Hell-O!" on cassette and on vinyl 33 1/3 format. The vinyl album was produced in regular black vinyl and a limited rare red vinyl, which was limited to 500 copies. The European Shimmy Disc release of Hell-O! features a bonus track, "Black And Huge," found on Gwar's next album, Scumdogs of the Universe. The song found on some copies of Hell-O! is an earlier version originally recorded to be released as a single on Sub Pop records, and is the first Gwar song to feature Michael Derks as a member, having replaced Stephen Douglas as BalSac The Jaws of Death.

The remastered Metal Blade release of the album does not feature this song. This version of the song fits in with Hell-O! more than it does with Scumdogs, as the guitars are not tuned down a half-step, and the tempo is faster and Oderus' vocals are more of the singing style from this album. A video for the track was also filmed and included on the TVD and The Next Mutation video collections.

== Reception ==
Professional ratings
Review scores
Source	Rating
AllMusic	3/5 stars
Select	4/5 stars

The album is a divisive point among fans of the band, who generally love it or hate it. Hell-O is the least-frequently played album in concert and discussed by the band in interviews, although this could be because the band's line-up has changed to the point where no one from this period has remained a constant member of the band (Michael Bishop rejoined in 2014 as new frontman Blothar following the death of Dave Brockie, who portrayed previous frontman Oderus Urungus). "Gwar Theme" and "Pure As The Arctic Snow" are the two songs most often played live (though they are rare in appearance), and occasionally, the band will play a medley of songs from the album, ranging anywhere from three songs to twelve songs, which is more than half the album.

Detractors of the album criticize its raw production. Chuck Varga, who played The Sexecutioner, posted on the Gwar fan page Bohab Central that he was so disgusted with the sound quality of the recording that he walked out of the session after hearing a few tracks. "I know the band's music and it sounded much better than it did on Hell-О!," he said, going on to say that producer Kramer "didn't care how Gwar sounded" and "gave us one of the most embarrassingly recorded LP's in history."

The [low] quality of the production is further indicated by the length of the recording session - the course of a single weekend. However, consensus across the board is that the album wasn't as bad as We Kill Everything, an album especially reviled by Dave Brockie and Michael Derks.

== Track listing ==
No.	Title	Writer(s)	Length
1.	"Time for Death"	Dave Brockie	2:44
2.	"AEIOU"	Brockie, Steve Douglas	1:25
3.	"Americanized"	Brockie, Douglas	1:36
4.	"I'm in Love (With a Dead Dog)"	Brockie, Douglas, Michael Bishop, Dewey Rowell	2:32
5.	"Slutman City"	Brockie, Greg Ottinger	3:49
6.	"World O Filth"	Brockie, Bishop	1:14
7.	"War Toy"	Brockie, Rowell	2:22
8.	"Captain Crunch"	Brockie, Bishop, Rowell	3:52
9.	"Pure as the Arctic Snow"	Brockie, Ottinger	2:27
10.	"Je M'Appelle J. Cousteau"	Brockie, Douglas, Bishop, Rowell	3:07
11.	"Gwar Theme"	Brockie, Douglas	2:26
12.	"Bone Meal"	Brockie	0:42
13.	"Ollie North"	Brockie, Bishop	1:55
14.	"Techno's Song" (Vocals by Techno Destructo)	Brockie, Douglas, Hunter Jackson, Ottinger	3:44
15.	"U Ain't Shit"	Brockie, Tim Herrman, Russ Bahorsky	1:19
16.	"Rock & Roll Pärty Town"	Brockie, Douglas	3:10

Bonus track
No.	Title	Writer(s)	Length
17.	"Black and Huge"	Brockie, Bishop, Douglas	2:16

== Personnel ==
Gwar

- Dave Brockie (Oderus Urungus) – lead vocals
- Dewey Rowell (Flattus Maximus) – lead and rhythm guitar, backing vocals
- Steve Douglas (Balsac the Jaws of Death) – lead and rhythm guitar, backing vocals
- Michael Bishop (Beefcake the Mighty) – bass, backing vocals
- Rob Mosby (Nippleus Erectus) – drums
- Don Drakulich (Techno Destructo) – lead vocals on "Techno's Song"

Production

- Kramer – engineering
- Adam Green – engineering assistant, assistant producer
