= Gwar =

American heavy metal band

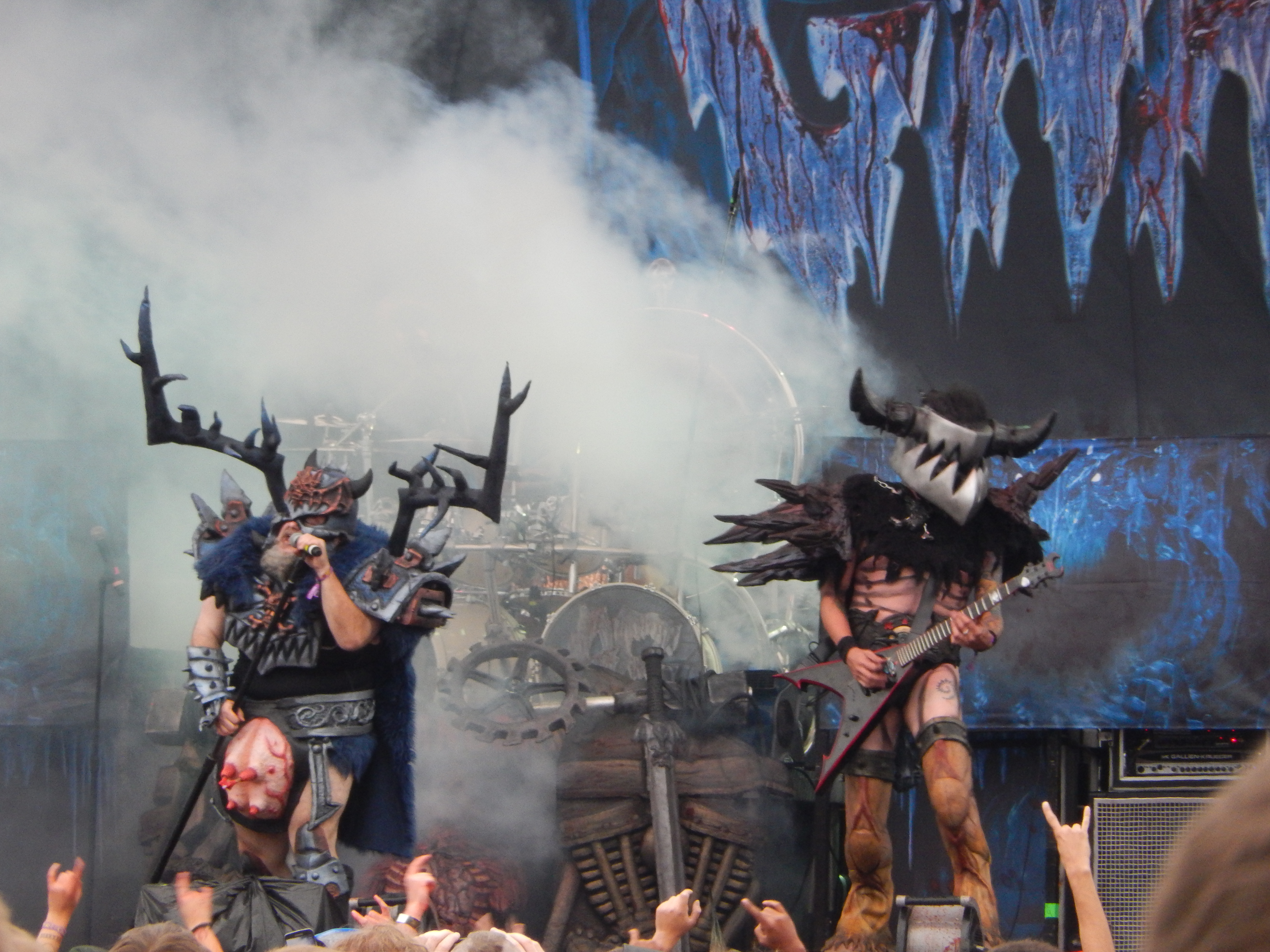
- Gwar live at Riot Fest, 2014

Background information
- Origin: Richmond, Virginia, U.S.
- Genres: Thrash metal; heavy metal; crossover thrash; shock rock; comedy
- Years active: 1984–present
- Labels: Shimmy Disc; Master; Metal Blade; DRT Entertainment
- Spinoffs: Dave Brockie Experience; X-Cops
- Spinoff of: Death Piggy
- Members: Michael Bishop; Mike Derks; Brad Roberts; Casey Orr; Matt Maguire; Bob Gorman; Tommy Meehan
- Past members: List of Gwar members
- Website: gwar.net

Gwar (often stylized in all caps) is an American heavy metal band formed in Richmond, Virginia, in 1984, composed of and operated by a frequently rotating line-up of musicians, artists, and filmmakers collectively known as Slave Pit Inc. Since the death of frontman Dave Brockie in 2014, the collective has continued recording and performing without any of its founding artists or musicians.

Identified by their distinctively grotesque costumes, Gwar's core thematic and visual concept revolves around an elaborate science fiction-themed mythology which portrays the band members as barbaric medieval Nordic, mythological, biblical or interplanetary warriors, a narrative which serves as the basis for all of the band's albums, live shows and media. With over-the-top violent, sexual, and scatological humor typically incorporating social and political satire, Gwar has attracted both acclaim and controversy for its music and stage shows, the latter of which notoriously showcase enactments of graphic violence that result in the audience being sprayed with fake blood, urine, and semen. Such stagecraft regularly leads Gwar to be labeled a "shock rock" band by the media.

Since its formation, Gwar has released 15 studio albums, two live albums, and numerous singles among other recordings, and has sold over 820,000 records in the United States. Fueled largely by the controversies surrounding their concerts, Gwar experienced brief mainstream notoriety during the first half of the 1990s, receiving regular airplay on MTV as well as frequent in-character guest appearances on daytime talk shows, satirizing the topics of censorship and media violence. Though the band's mainstream popularity declined by the end of the 1990s, Gwar has retained a dedicated cult following. The band's extensive videography consists of both live recordings and long-form feature films, most notably 1992's Phallus in Wonderland, which earned a Grammy Award nomination for Best Long Form Music Video. Gwar has also expanded its brand into other areas such as books, comic books, board games, beer, whisky, barbecue sauce, CBD, e-liquids, toy collectibles, and sex toys.

In 2016, the staff of Loudwire named them the 46th-best metal band of all time.

== History ==
=== Formation and debut (1984–1989) ===
Gwar is the result of two separate projects merged into one. Dave Brockie was the vocalist and bassist for a punk band named Death Piggy that staged mini-plays and used crude props to punctuate its music. Bands would occasionally practice in a room at the Richmond Dairy, a deserted bottling plant that had been taken over by hippies. The hippies rented out interior areas to various artists and musicians. It was at the Richmond Dairy that Death Piggy met Hunter Jackson (Techno Destructo) and Chuck Varga (Sexecutioner), both attendees of Virginia Commonwealth University who had set up "The Slave Pit", a production space for Scumdogs of the Universe, a movie they intended to make.

Jackson created props for Death Piggy to use on stage. Brockie had an idea to use the costumes made for Scumdogs of the Universe and have Death Piggy open for itself as a barbaric band from Antarctica, playing nonsense songs while sacrificing fake animals. The name of the joke group was "Gwaaarrrgghhlllgh". The members of Death Piggy began noticing that more people were coming to see Gwaaarrrgghhlllgh and leaving immediately after the set. After several refinements, including shortening the band's name, Death Piggy was phased out in favor of the band now named Gwar.

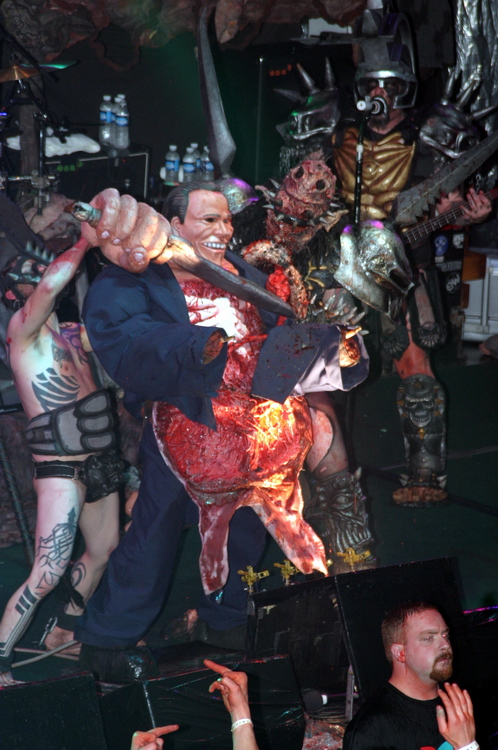
Abuse of an Arnold Schwarzenegger character – live at Reds, Edmonton

The first known line-up for Gwar consisted of Ben Eubanks (vocals), Brockie (guitar), Steve Douglas (guitar), Chris Bopst (bass guitar), Jim Thomson (drums) and Jackson. However, this line-up was short-lived and would suffer multiple changes in the following months, with Eubanks quitting after just one or two shows and being replaced by Joe Annaruma, who went on to record several demo tracks with the band. Annaruma quit soon after this, and Brockie became the main vocalist for the band. The band solidified into a line-up consisting of Jackson, Don Drakulich, Varga, Mike Delaney, Mike Bonner, Scott Krahl, Dave Musel and Brockie.

Mike Delaney left in 1987. Dewey Rowell (Flattus Maximus), Michael Bishop (Beefcake the Mighty) and Rob Mosby (Nippleus Erectus) were recruited in 1987, along with Steve Douglas (Balsac the Jaws of Death), who rejoined the band after having previously left. Danielle Stampe (also known as Slymenstra Hymen) joined in 1988 as the first full-time female member of Gwar for the first U.S. tour supporting Gwar's debut album Hell-O and toured consistently with the band until 2000. The band has also recruited, and lost, three other female members: The Temptress, Heather Broome (1986); Amazina, Colette Miller (1986–87); and Gwar Woman, Lisa Harrelson (1987–88).

The band's debut album, Hell-O, a crossover thrash metal-punk rock album, was released in 1988 under Shimmy Disc. The band started touring in support of the album, with Steve Douglas leaving that same year, later to form the alternative band Log, and being replaced by current rhythm guitarist Michael Derks, who took over Douglas' alias as Balsac the Jaws of Death.

However, the band's line-up underwent further changes before 1990. In 1988, the Slave Pit saw the joining of Bob Gorman, a young, new artist who would help with the art design and fabrication aspects of the band. One year later, in 1989, Rob Mobsy left the band and was replaced by Pete Luchter, who also quit to be replaced temporarily by Jim Thompson, who had been in the band prior to the release of Hell-O. Thompson later quit and was replaced by Brad Roberts, who has since portrayed Jizmak Da Gusha.

=== Scumdogs of the Universe and This Toilet Earth (1990–1994) ===
With Gwar's line-up somewhat solidified, the band would set up to record Scumdogs of the Universe released worldwide on producer Ivan Healy Purvis' label Master Records, a subsidiary of Blue Beat Records. The album met with a moderately large mainstream success and would mark the start of a career under the Metal Blade Records record label. The band would tour extensively in support for this album, releasing the Live from Antarctica produced by Ivan Healy Purvis, VHS tape in July 1990, containing, among other things, the music video for the song Sick of You. It was shortly after the video's release when the Slave Pit took in young up-‌and-‌coming artist Matt Maguire, to help out with costume fabrication, as well as illustrations for comics and related material.

In August 1990, the birth of Michael Derks' daughter resulted in his taking a short break from the band. Barry 'D'live' Ward from the band Rich Kids on LSD filled in on guitar as Balsac during Gwar's 1991 European tour. On September 18, 1990, Brockie wore his "Cuttlefish of Cthulhu" codpiece during a show in Charlotte, North Carolina, resulting in Brockie's arrest and, ultimately, a one-year ban from the band performing in the state of North Carolina; the band would later highlight the absurdity of the case by pointing out that the presiding judge over the case was called Dick Boner. Upon returning home, Gwar filmed its first cameo in a mainstream film, Mystery Date.

Scumdogs of the Universe was originally released through the U.K. label Master before being picked up by Metal Blade in 1991. In the group's hunt for a larger label, they auditioned for Relativity Records, one of the larger independent heavy metal labels. The group failed their audition when they arrived in costume and Slymenstra Hymen broke a blood capsule from her codpiece onto one of the office chairs, simulating menstruation.

The band suffered further line-up changes during this period, with Dewey Rowell leaving the band in 1991 and not being replaced until 1992 by Pete Lee, after the recording of America Must Be Destroyed. The Charlotte, North Carolina incident from 1990 was the inspiration for Gwar's third album, America Must Be Destroyed, released in 1992. The album was accompanied by the movie Phallus in Wonderland, which documented the main concept and contained music videos for the album. Phallus in Wonderland was nominated for a Grammy Award in 1993. After recording for This Toilet Earth was completed, bassist Mike Bishop left the band. He was replaced by Casey Orr, from the band Rigor Mortis.

This Toilet Earth was released in 1994, to moderate success. The album received additional attention due to controversy surrounding "B.D.F.", a song that graphically refers to subjects such as sodomy, necrophilia, pre-natal rape, pedophilia and mutilation. 1994 also saw the music videos for "Saddam a Go-Go" and "The Road Behind" being aired on Beavis and Butt-head. This would also mark the beginning of the band straying from their trademark sound, as the album contained several experimental songs as opposed to the punk of Hell-O and thrash of Scumdogs of the Universe.

=== Ragnarök, Carnival of Chaos and We Kill Everything (1995–2000) ===
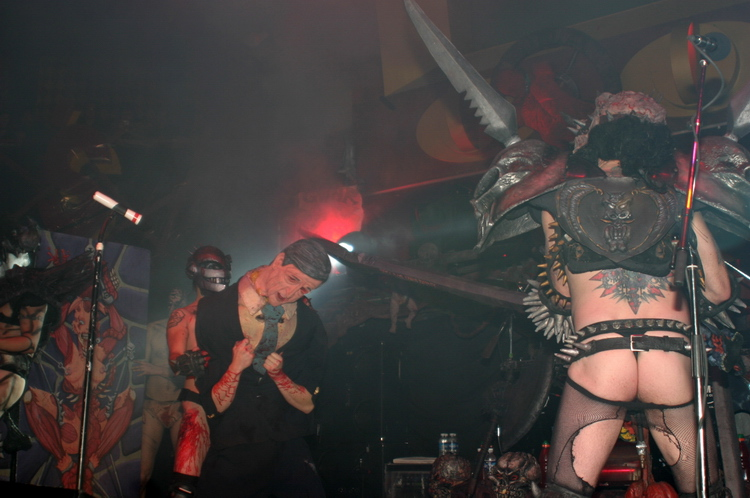
Gwar started their Edmonton show with a simulated decapitation.

In 1995, Gwar released Ragnarök, an album characterized by a unique sound, including the use of keyboards, something largely unseen before by the band, as well as a much greater use of secondary vocalists. The record is considered to have been largely unnoticed after the success of the previous three albums. Despite this, the band would record two videos for the album, "Surf of Syn" and "Meat Sandwich" as well as release Rendezvous with Ragnarok to support the album's plot through footage from the supporting tour. Later that year, the band also made a cameo appearance in the film Empire Records.

The band's first side project, X-Cops, would also come to life after the Ragnarok tour, releasing their only full-length album, You Have the Right to Remain Silent..., the same year.

Doom developer, id Software, hired Gwar to produce a showcase space at Microsoft's Judgement Day event for Halloween of 1995.

Gwar appeared in a video game focused Circuit City television advertisement in 1996.

The band's next record would come out in 1997 under the name Carnival of Chaos, proving to be the epitome of this experimental period containing songs from many different genres, including the classic heavy metal, but also hard rock, country, and even jazz. Shortly after the release of Carnival of Chaos, select members of the Gwar ensemble appeared on The Jerry Springer Show to discuss the growing trend of "shock rock" and their role as entertainers. Aside from their appearance on The Joan Rivers Show, this guest appearance is still recognized as one of their most infamous appearances on national television. In 1998, Gwar fought the ska band, The Aquabats!, during The Ska Parade.

Carnival of Chaos would be the last album with Pete Lee on guitar, being replaced by Tim Harriss who had previously been in the band around 1986 and was featured as a guest guitarist on America Must Be Destroyed. For the recording of We Kill Everything between late 1998 and early 1999, Michael Bishop would temporarily rejoin the band as the bassist during the absence of Casey Orr. The record, largely influenced by punk rock, is the band's least favorite album and thus its songs are rarely played live.

Following this, co-founder, Hunter Jackson, left the group in 2000 to focus on personal projects. Danielle Stampe also left the band to focus on a personal project named Girly Freakshow; however, she rejoined the band temporarily for the Bitch Is Back tour in 2002.

=== Violence Has Arrived and the DRT Entertainment years (2001–2009) ===
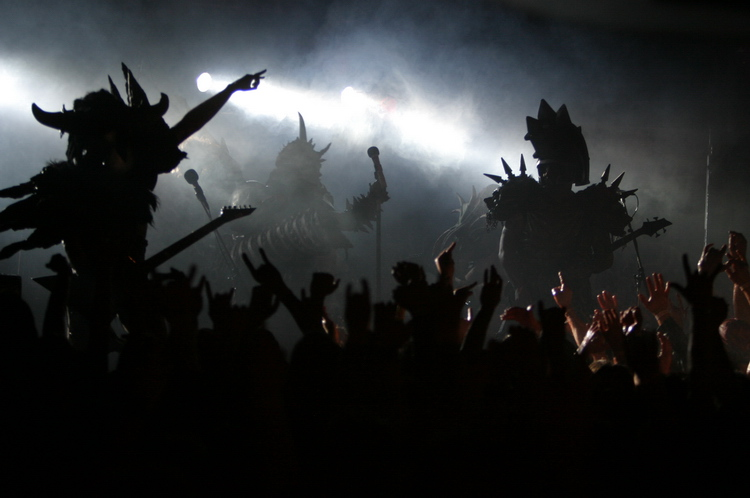
Gwar in concert in Edmonton

Due to the band's distaste for the previous album, Gwar's sound changed considerably for the next recording. With Tim Harriss gone, Zach Blair was hired to fill his spot as Flattus Maximus, Casey Orr also having returned to the band as Beefcake the Mighty for the recording of the band's first entirely thrash metal album in years: Violence Has Arrived, released on November 6, 2001, the album being seen as a "comeback" of sorts and setting off changes that resulted in the current state of the band.

In 2002 Zach Blair left Gwar to form the power-pop band Armstrong along with drummer Brad Roberts. The band released one album titled Dick the Lionhearted. Since February 2007, Blair has been the guitarist for Rise Against.

As the band focused on a heavier, more brutal sound near the end of this period, it would also result in the creation of another side project, the Dave Brockie Experience, a band created by frontman Dave Brockie along with rhythm guitarist Mike Derks and drummer Brad Roberts as a way of continuing the comedic sound found on albums like We Kill Everything while maintaining a more serious focus in releases by Gwar. They released their first LP on March 20, 2001, Diarrhea of a Madman.

In June 2004, Gwar left Metal Blade and signed with DRT Entertainment. The band left Metal Blade due to the label's perceived lack of faith in the band and the lack of album distribution beyond the US, along with the band's belief that they were funding "shitty bands on the label". Despite this, the band maintained they had no animosity to Brian Slagel or the label in general.

Their first album for the label, War Party, was released in October of that year. The album met with a large underground success, as it followed the same path Violence Has Arrived did, but this time with a more serious and technical edge, partially thanks to the efforts of new lead guitarist Cory Smoot (Flattus Maximus) and bass guitarist Todd Evans (Beefcake the Mighty). Videos were released for "Bring Back the Bomb" and "War Party," and the band was invited to play on the Sounds of the Underground tour in 2005. That same year the band released Live from Mt. Fuji, the band's first live album besides the then extremely rare You're All Worthless and Weak, released in 2000 (and re-released in 2006) on Slave Pit Records.

In 2004 Gwar teamed up with Grey DeLisle (as the voice of Grandma Stuffum) in the Codename: Kids Next Door episode "Operation F. O. O. D. F. I. T. E."; the band was credited as Rawg and the songs "The Private Pain of Techno Destructo", "Morality Squad", and "Gor-Gor" were performed with new lyrics, pertaining to the episode, written for each song.

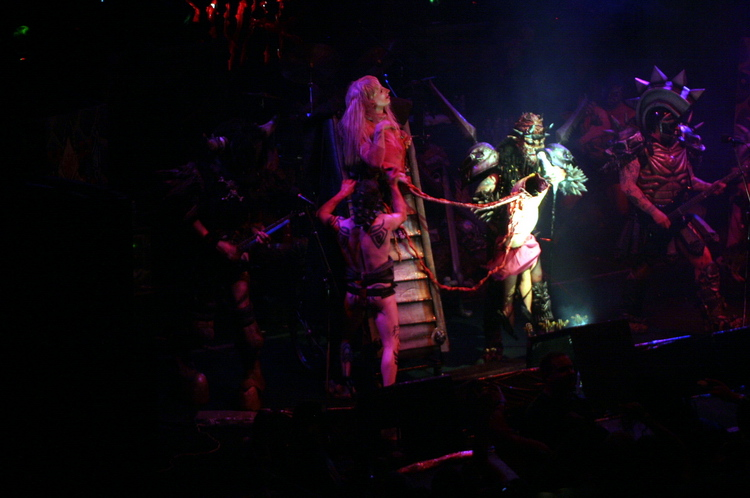
Disemboweling a Paris Hilton character – part of Gwar show in Edmonton, 2004

Gwar began work on their next album, tentatively titled Go to Hell!, in January 2006. That same month, Gwar opened a gallery show called "The Art of Gwar" at Art Space gallery in Richmond to display the many props, costumes, cartoons, paintings produced by The Slave Pit, Gwar's art and effects studio.

On February 23, 2006, Gwar's official website announced Gwar's album, officially titled Beyond Hell, for which, at the urging of DRT Entertainment, a cover version of Alice Cooper's "School's Out" was recorded and released. The music video was directed by David Brodsky on July 2, 2006. The part of the "school marm" has been mistakenly identified as Devin Townsend, the producer of the Beyond Hell CD. It is actually Scott Krahl, a long-time Gwar "slave" and inventor of Gor-Gor. "School's Out" was nominated for Best Video of 2006 on MTV2's Headbanger's Ball.

The Blood Bath and Beyond DVD was released on June 20, 2006, containing exclusive behind the scenes and vintage footage of the band.

Gwar performed a special "half-time" show at the Sounds Of The Underground 2006 tour. Gwar went on to headline the following year's Sounds of the Underground Tour in 2007.

Vocalist Oderus Urungus is also featured on the last Strapping Young Lad album The New Black as a guest vocalist on the song "Far Beyond Metal". Oderus' lines in the song are taken directly from the Gwar song "Maggots" ("now in the halls of the Necrolord..." etc.).

Beyond Hell was released on August 29, 2006, with Gwar touring to support the album and being helped by the creation of new props for this tour, including several characters from Beyond Hell's plot, including Jitler and Jewcifer. Gwar was also present at the third annual Rock & Shock festival from October 13 to 15 as a part of this tour.

In Spring 2008 Todd Evans left Gwar to focus efforts on his project Mobile Deathcamp. Shortly after Todd's departure, Casey Orr was confirmed to return as Beefcake the Mighty.

Sleazy P. Martini returned to the stage with Gwar during their Electile Dysfunction '08 tour.

=== Twenty-fifth anniversary, return to Metal Blade and death of Cory Smoot (2009–2014) ===
In May 2009, Gwar re-signed with Metal Blade after DRT Entertainment closed down (with the band getting their master tapes from DRT), and the band celebrated their 25th year of existence.

Gwar's eleventh studio album, Lust in Space, was released on August 18, 2009, They performed at the 2009 Gathering of the Juggalos and toured nationwide with Lamb of God and Job for a Cowboy. In 2009, Gwar celebrated their 25th year as a band.

The band released a 2009 Christmas vinyl record consisting of a new song titled "Christmas Stripper Summer Weekend" and a live Hell-O medley.

Oderus Urungus hosted the "Crack-a-Thon" in Brooklyn, New York at the MF Gallery in April 2010. A second Crack-A-Thon followed in 2011.

On November 9, 2010, Gwar released their twelfth studio album, Bloody Pit of Horror.

On November 3, 2011, lead guitarist Cory Smoot, who had portrayed Flattus Maximus since 2002, was found dead by his fellow band members in the band's tour bus as they prepared to cross the border into Manitoba, Canada from North Dakota. The cause of death was "a coronary artery thrombosis brought about by his pre-existing coronary artery disease." On November 4, Dave Brockie officially announced that the character of Flattus Maximus would be retired out of respect to Smoot.

The last single recorded with Smoot was released on December 22, 2011, and is a cover of the Dayglo Abortions song "Isn't This Disgusting". The single was made available on iTunes and appeared on the Dayglo Abortions tribute album in 2012.

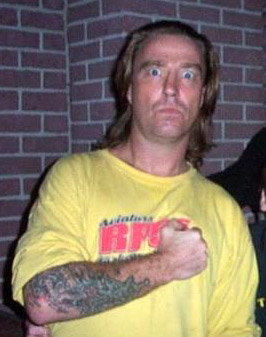
Former lead singer-bassist Dave Brockie

On April 3, 2012, a television sit-com created by horror filmmaker Adam Green and starring Brockie portraying Oderus Urungus titled Holliston debuted on the FEARnet cable television network. The series starred Oderus as series lead Green's imaginary alien friend who lives in his closet. Brockie toured and appeared with his castmates as Oderus at many live performances of Holliston across the United States in 2012 and 2013.

Green appeared on stage with Gwar several times when the band had him introduce their encore performance. The full Holliston cast was "murdered" on stage and fed to both Gwar's world maggot and meat grinder at several US shows. A third season of Holliston was being scripted by Green when Brockie died of a heroin overdose in March 2014.

Cannabis Corpse guitarist Brent Purgason took over the late Cory Smoot's role under the name Pustulus Maximus in late 2012, making his first appearance with the band in a video on The A.V. Club of the band playing a cover of Kansas' 1976 hit tune "Carry on My Wayward Son". In September 2013 Gwar's thirteenth studio album, titled Battle Maximus, was released. Promotional activities for the record included a video of Gwar covering Billy Ocean's "Get Outta My Dreams, Get Into My Car" and The Who's "Baba O'Riley", and a one-off Funny Or Die animated cartoon produced by Myke Chilian and Gwar titled The Animated Tales of Gwar.

=== Death of Dave Brockie, GwarBar, and future (2014–present) ===
On March 23, 2014, Dave Brockie, age 50, was found dead by a roommate in his Richmond, Virginia, apartment. The cause of death was later confirmed to be a heroin overdose. Brockie's death left the collective without any of its founding artists or musicians.

The surviving members of Gwar and the Slave Pit released a video statement to announce the creation of the David Brockie Foundation, a charity fund for the encouragement of future talent and the preservation of Brockie's body of work. Their first goal with the foundation was to construct a memorial monument to him in Richmond to provide a place of respect for the former frontman of Gwar. Former bassist Mike Bishop, the original Beefcake the Mighty, re-joined the band as vocalist for their first performance without Brockie at the fifth Gwar-B-Q at Hadad's Lake. The performance was preceded by a public memorial service the day before, the singer's Oderus Urungus character was given a Viking funeral.

Gwar played at the following month's Riot Fest in Chicago and went back on tour in December 2014, with new character Vulvatron, played by Kim Dylla. They also appeared again in an A.V Club video, playing a cover of the Pet Shop Boys' "West End Girls" which transitioned into "People Who Died" by Jim Carroll—as a tribute to Cory Smoot, Dave Brockie and other friends of Gwar who have since died. Kim Dylla was released from the band at the beginning of 2015. In October 2016 Gwar released The Blood of Gods, their first album without founding member and longtime vocalist Brockie.

In January 2015, GwarBar (stylized as GWARbar) opened in the Jackson Ward neighborhood of Richmond, Virginia. Mike Derks and Travis Croxton, Richmond's "Restaurateur of the Year 2014," co-own what they self-refer to as an upscale dive bar. Derks, who also serves as executive chef, collaborated with head chef Jeremy Dutra to create the restaurant's menu. The band's website describes the bar as "a fantasy land of food and beverage, catering to everyone from local punk metal freaks, rock stars, businessmen, celebrity chefs and starving artists." On May 29, 2020, the restaurant opened its long-planned outdoor beer garden after being closed to indoor dining for two months as a result of the COVID-19 pandemic.

In February 2019, Jamison Land left the band and Casey Orr later returned to fill the role of Beefcake once again. A remixed and remastered 30th anniversary edition of Scumdogs of the Universe was released the following year and on day of release the band broadcast an anniversary reunion concert where the album was performed in its entirety for the first time. Dubbed "Scumdogs XXX Live," it marked the first time that Gwar co-founder Hunter Jackson had directly worked with the band since his departure in 2000.

The Disc with No Name, a limited edition picture disc containing four acoustic renditions of previously released songs, was released in May 2021. The band embarked on a Scumdogs 30th anniversary tour, featuring co-founder Hunter Jackson, and released the Scumdogs XXX Live concert album. On June 3, 2022, Gwar released their fifteenth studio album, The New Dark Ages, alongside a graphic novel, Gwar in The Duoverse of Absurdity, released by Z2 Comics. In July 2023, Gwar performed on NPR's Tiny Desk Concert. The band dedicated their final song to Oderus Urungus. On November 5, 2023, Purgason announced his departure from the band after eleven years of membership, noting that he was leaving on good terms and would still be involved in some capacity behind the scenes.

On November 21, 2023, Balsac the Jaws of Death announced that he was co-writing a Gwar movie entitled Gwar Must Die.

On February 29, 2024, It was announced that Tommy Meehan (of Squid Pisser and formerly of Cancer Christ) had joined the lineup under the name Grodius Maximus, taking over as lead guitarist for Brent Purgason, also known as Pustulus Maximus.

On April 15, 2025, the band released the single and video for a new song called "Lot Lizard". This was accompanied by the announcement of the upcoming "The Return Of Gor Gor" EP, along with a 32-page comic book of the same name. The album and comic were released on July 25, 2025.

On August 30, 2025, an episode of the Angry Video Game Nerd was released, which included guest appearances of Tommy Meehan and Matt Maguire, who appeared as their on stage characters Grodius Maximus and Sawborg Destructo.

An exhibition of Gwar props, costumes and ephemera opened on September 13, 2025 at the Beyond the Streets Gallery in Los Angeles, California and was scheduled to run through November 2. Chuck Varga died from cancer on September 25, 2026.

== Etymology ==
Despite various explanations that Gwar is an acronym for something (such as "God what an awful racket"), band members have consistently stated that the letters do not stand for anything. The official website of Slave Pit Inc. indicates that Gwar is a shortened version of "Gwaaarrrgghhlllgh", the name the band used originally when opening for Death Piggy.

== Gwar-B-Q ==
From 2009 to 2016 Gwar hosted an annual festival in Richmond, Virginia, called "Gwar-B-Q". The festival boasted a barbecue, rock-and-roll vendors, a haunted house of sorts (which "bohabs" can visit to be spewed and bled upon) and live music. Held at Hadad's Lake, a natural water park in Richmond, Gwar-B-Q quickly grew into a destination event having hosted bands like Clutch, Down, Dead Earth Politics, Cancer Bats, and The Dickies. At the 2014 Gwar-B-Q, the first since Dave Brockie's death, the singer's Oderus Urungus character was given a Viking funeral, with his stage costume burned on a funeral pyre on Hadad's Lake.

== Grammy nominations ==
Gwar has twice been nominated for a Grammy.

- 1993: Phallus in Wonderland – Best Long Form Music Video at the 35th Annual Grammy Awards (won by Annie Lennox)
- 1996: "S.F.W." – Best Metal Performance at the 38th Annual Grammy Awards (won by Nine Inch Nails)

== Controversies ==
In 2014, Gwar came under fire for scenes at the Soundwave music festival where Urungus beheaded an effigy of Australian then-Prime Minister Tony Abbott, with the effigy then spraying fake blood into the audience. They also came under fire for slicing the breasts off an effigy of Queen Elizabeth II.

In June 2026, the band revealed that they had been investigated by the United States Secret Service, following a stunt at the previous year's Riot Fest which involved an effigy of U.S. President Donald Trump being disemboweled.

"[Gwar frontman Michael Bishop] points out that Gwar have previously 'killed' liberal figures too, adding: 'We killed President Obama. We didn't hear from the Secret Service. But you kill Trump, and you better believe that there's gonna be some shit going on'."

== Band members ==
Current

- Mike Derks (Balsac the Jaws of Death) – rhythm guitar (1988–present)
- Brad Roberts (Jizmak Da Gusha) – drums (1989–present)
- Matt Maguire (Sawborg Destructo) – co-lead vocals (1994–1996, 2009–present)
- Bob Gorman (Bonesnapper) – backing vocals (1995–1996, 2014–present)
- Michael Bishop (Blöthar the Berserker) – lead vocals (2014–present), (Beefcake the Mighty) – bass, backing vocals (1987–1993, 1998–1999)
- Casey Orr (Beefcake the Mighty) – bass, backing vocals (1994–1997, 1999–2002, 2008–2011, 2019–present)
- Tommy Meehan (Grodius Maximus) – lead guitar, backing vocals (2024–present)

== Discography ==
- Hell-O (1988)
- Scumdogs of the Universe (1990)
- America Must Be Destroyed (1992)
- This Toilet Earth (1994)
- Ragnarök (1995)
- Carnival of Chaos (1997)
- We Kill Everything (1999)
- Violence Has Arrived (2001)
- War Party (2004)
- Beyond Hell (2006)
- Lust in Space (2009)
- Bloody Pit of Horror (2010)
- Battle Maximus (2013)
- The Blood of Gods (2017)
- The New Dark Ages (2022)
