= Bloody Pit of Horror (album) =

Studio album by Gwar
- Released: November 9, 2010
- Genres: Thrash metal, groove metal, doom metal
- Length: 37:02
- Label: Metal Blade
- Producer: Cory Smoot

Gwar chronology
Lust in Space (2009)	Bloody Pit of Horror (2010)	Battle Maximus (2013)

Professional ratings
Review scores
Source	Rating
Allmusic	3.5/5 stars

Bloody Pit of Horror is the twelfth studio album by American heavy metal band Gwar. It was released on November 9, 2010, on Metal Blade Records.

The first track, "Zombies, March!" is now available for streaming at Bloody-Disgusting's website.

This is the last album to feature longtime character Flattus Maximus before Cory Smoot's death and Flattus' subsequent retirement. It also marks the last album to feature bassist Casey Orr before his third departure from the band in 2011. This album does not have a coinciding movie.

== Track listing ==
No.	Title	Length
1.	"Zombies, March!"	4:33
2.	"Come the Carnivore"	2:23
3.	"A Gathering of Ghouls"	2:07
4.	"Storm is Coming"	3:54
5.	"Tick-Tits"	3:18
6.	"Beat You to Death" (Vocals by Beefcake the Mighty)	3:39
7.	"You Are My Meat"	2:33
8.	"Hail, Genocide!"	3:19
9.	"KZ Necromancer"	3:19
10.	"The Litany of the Slain"	4:16
11.	"Sick and Twisted"	3:42
12.	"Hell-O Medley (Live)" (Bonus on European version)	7:51
13.	"Stripper Christmas Summer Weekend" (Bonus on European version)	4:13

== Line-up ==
- Dave Brockie (Oderus Urungus) - lead vocals
- Cory Smoot (Flattus Maximus) - lead guitar, backing vocals
- Mike Derks (Balsac the Jaws of Death) - rhythm guitar, backing vocals
- Casey Orr (Beefcake the Mighty) - bass, backing vocals, lead vocals on "Beat You to Death"
- Brad Roberts (Jizmak Da Gusha) - drums
