= Lust in Space =

Studio album by Gwar
- Released: August 18, 2009
- Recorded: 2008
- Genres: Thrash metal, heavy metal, comedy rock
- Length: 44:35
- Label: Metal Blade Records
- Producers: Cory Smoot and Gwar

Gwar chronology
Beyond Hell (2006)	Lust in Space (2009)	Bloody Pit of Horror (2010)

Professional ratings
Review scores
Source	Rating
About.com	3.5/5 stars
AllMusic	3.5/5 stars
Blabbermouth	7.5/10 stars
Kerrang!	3/5 stars

Lust in Space is the eleventh studio album by American heavy metal band Gwar. It was released on August 18, 2009. It is their first album since returning to their old label Metal Blade Records. The album also saw the return of their former bassist Casey Orr, even though he would later part ways with the band yet again. Lust in Space debuted at #96 on the Billboard top 200 Charts and according to Blabbermouth it was Gwar's highest position reached for the debut of an album.

The cover is a parody/homage of the Kiss album Love Gun.

== Overview ==
This time around, Gwar manages to steal a Scumdog ship and prepares to finally leave Earth. However, Cardinal Syn returns and plans an attack. Gwar then seeks the help of Zog, an old Scumdog commander who trained Oderus, to help them. However, it turns out that he has become old and homeless. Gwar eventually sets everything straight and leave Earth, promising to stop on tour, and keep everyone up to date on their activities.

The album also introduces a new Destructo, Sawborg, who wields a sawblade arm and has another sawblade sticking out of his head. He is not mentioned on the album, except briefly in "Gwarnography".

In an interview with Ultimate-Guitar, Cory Smoot (Flattus Maximus) revealed that he played all the instruments on "Release the Flies", as it was originally a song he wrote for his solo project.

== Track listing ==
No.	Title	Length
1.	"Lust in Space"	6:12
2.	"Let Us Slay"	3:25
3.	"Damnation Under God"	3:27
4.	"The UberKlaw"	3:39
5.	"Lords and Masters"	4:53
6.	"Metal Metal Land"	3:05
7.	"The Price of Peace" (Vocals by Beefcake the Mighty)	3:37
8.	"Where Is Zog?"	4:53
9.	"Make a Child Cry"	2:59
10.	"Release the Flies" (Vocals by Flattus Maximus)	4:10
11.	"Parting Shot"	4:16
12.	"Gwarnography" (Bonus track available only when album is purchased as an online download)	6:03

== Personnel ==
- Dave Brockie (Oderus Urungus) - lead vocals
- Cory Smoot (Flattus Maximus) - lead guitar, backing vocals, lead vocals on "Release the Flies"
- Mike Derks (Balsac the Jaws of Death) - rhythm guitar, backing vocals
- Casey Orr (Beefcake the Mighty) - bass, backing vocals, lead vocals on "The Price of Peace"
- Brad Roberts (Jizmak Da Gusha) - drums, percussion
