= Flood City Music Festival =

Music Festival in Johnstown, Pennsylvania

Coordinates: 40.32919°N 78.92387°W

- Genre: Rock, hard rock, soft rock, alternative rock, progressive rock, indie, new wave, rock and roll, rockabilly, Southern rock, country, pop, blues, funk, jazz, fusion, swing, rhythm and blues, soul, big band, gospel, reggae, Celtic, Zydeco, bluegrass, folk, world, Americana, polka, jam
- Dates: August/September
- Location: Johnstown, Pennsylvania
- Years active: 1989-2019, 2021–present
- Founders: Johnstown Area Heritage Association, AmeriServ, Commonwealth of Johnstown
- Website: www.floodcitymusic.com

Flood City Music Festival is an annual music festival held in Johnstown, Pennsylvania, presented by the Johnstown Area Heritage Association. The festival began in 1989 as a street fair to commemorate the 100th Anniversary of the Johnstown Flood. The event was renamed the National Folk Festival in 1990, and was held in Johnstown's Cambria City neighborhood from 1990 to 1992. In 1993, it was renamed the Johnstown FolkFest and eventually the festival moved from Cambria City to downtown Johnstown in 2004. The festival emphasized acoustic music, but was expanded and renamed the Flood City Music Festival in 2009 to include other styles of music.

2020 saw no festival, but it resumed the next year.

== 2025 Flood City Music Festival Lineup ==
- Gov't Mule
- Andy Frasco & the U.N.
- Dream the Heavy
- Jennifer Hartswick
- Katie Henry
- King's Ransom
- LaMP
- Miss Freddye
- Natalie Brooke
- Octave Cat
- Pigeons Playing Ping Pong
- Screech Owl
- Sicard Hollow
- The Buckle Downs
- The Motet
- The Regal Sweet
- Wanderlost

== 2024 Flood City Music Festival Lineup ==
- Daniel Donato’s Cosmic Country
- Andy Frasco & the U.N.
- Maggie Rose
- Organ Fairchild
- Endless Mike & the Beagle Club
- Soulful Femme
- The Salt Brothers
- Melvin Seals & JGB feat. Ron Holloway
- Jerry Harrison & Adrian Belew: Remain in Light
- The Hypochondriacs
- Couch
- Runaway Gin: A Tribute to Phish
- Smooth Sound Band
- The Hillbilly Biscuits
- The Whiskey River Panhandlers
- Billy the Kid & the Regulators

== 2023 Flood City Music Festival Lineup ==
- Keller Williams' Grateful Grass
- The HillBenders
- Doom Flamingo
- Yam Yam
- The Mallett Brothers Band
- Gabe Stillman
- Jeff Webb and the Delectable Sound
- The Jaded Lips
- Los Lobos
- Trouble No More
- Melt
- Dogs In A Pile
- Big Sandy & His Fly-Rite Boys
- Chalk Dinosaur
- The Evergreens
- The Platelets

== 2022 Flood City Music Festival Lineup ==
- Spin Doctors
- Railroad Earth
- Big Something (cancelled)
- Sunsquabi
- Brandon Niederauer
- The Ally Venable Band
- Karina Rykman
- Vanessa Collier
- The Fritz
- Habatat
- Shelf Life String Band
- Silver Screen
- Kevin Dale
- Rusty Shackle

== 2020 Flood City Music Festival Lineup ==
Festival temporarily suspended due to the COVID-19 pandemic

== 2014 Flood City Music Festival Lineup ==
- Boz Scaggs
- Leftover Salmon with special guest Bill Payne
- Lee Fields & The Expressions
- Hurray for the Riff Raff
- Dumpstaphunk
- Rubblebucket
- Nahko and Medicine for the People
- Cornmeal
- Big Sam's Funky Nation
- Turkuaz
- The Iguanas
- Nicole Atkins
- Jarekus Singleton
- Driftwood
- Big Mean Sound Machine
- Neon Swing X-perience
- The Greens
- Bastard Bearded Irishmen
- Ikebe Shakedown
- Miss Melanie & the Valley Rats
- City Dwelling Nature Seekers
- Grand Piano
- The Hawkeyes
- Smackdab
- Swampcandy
- Good Brother Earl
- Whiskey River Panhandlers
- The Weathered Road
- Amanda Barton & Bill Ward
- Matt Otis & the Sound
- Striped Maple Hollow
- Tim Woods & the Woods Family Band

== 2013 Flood City Music Festival Lineup ==
- Trombone Shorty & Orleans Avenue
- Robert Randolph and the Family Band
- Greensky Bluegrass
- George Porter, Jr. & The Runnin' Pardners
- Kenny Neal
- Bonerama
- Snarky Puppy
- Sister Sparrow & the Dirty Birds
- Chuck Prophet & The Mission Express
- Stephen Kellogg and the Sixers
- Spirit Family Reunion
- Turkuaz
- The Funk Ark
- Sol Driven Train
- Rumpke Mountain Boys
- Alexes Aiken
- Johnny Sketch & the Dirty Notes
- The Kalob Griffin Band
- New York Funk Exchange
- Bastard Bearded Irishmen
- Jazzam featuring Clinton Clegg
- Cait Cuneo
- Tiger Maple String Band
- Maddie Georgi Band
- Old E Allstars
- Well Strung
- 600 lbs. of Sin
- The Weedrags
- Midnight Drive
- The Beagle Brothers
- The Derek Woodz Band
- The Pawnbrokers
- The Crew of the Half Moon
- West Hills All-Stars

== 2012 Flood City Music Festival Lineup ==
- Dr. John & the Lower 911
- Del McCoury Band
- The Smithereens
- Steve Kimock with special guests Bernie Worrell, Wally Ingram and Andy Hess
- Royal Southern Brotherhood
- Big Sam's Funky Nation
- Sonny Landreth
- Anders Osborne
- Johnny Sketch & The Dirty Notes
- Eric Lindell with Anson Funderburgh
- The Revelations featuring Tre Williams
- Billy Price Band
- Chandler Travis Philharmonic
- Eric Tessmer
- John Howie & the Rosewood Bluff
- The New York Funk Exchange
- Yellow Dubmarine
- Jimmy Adler
- One World Tribe
- Moon River Ramblers
- Fletcher’s Grove
- Jazzam
- Backstabbing Good People
- Gypsy & His Band of Ghosts
- The Harlan Twins
- JKutchma & the Five Fifths
- Whiskey River Panhandlers
- Charlie Dane
- Shiva Skydriver
- Groove Gathering
- Chris Vipond and the Stanley Street Band

== 2011 Flood City Music Festival Lineup ==
- Gregg Allman
- JJ Grey & MOFRO
- Bettye LaVette
- Black Joe Lewis & the Honeybears
- Project/Object featuring Ike Willis & Ray White
- Terrance Simien and the Zydeco Experience
- The Bridge
- Tab Benoit
- The Pimps of Joytime
- Bill Kirchen & Too Much Fun
- Brothers Past
- The Hackensaw Boys
- Lubriphonic
- That 1 Guy
- Boogie Hustlers
- Sister Sparrow & the Dirty Birds
- American Babies
- Sweet Earth
- Shelf Life String Band
- City Dwelling Nature Seekers
- 600 Lbs. of Sin
- Clinton Clegg & the Backstabbing Good People
- Black Coffee
- Southside Strays
- Jeff Perigo & Friends

== 2010 Flood City Music Festival Lineup ==
- Los Lobos
- Galactic with special guests Cyril Neville and Corey Henry
- Robert Cray Band
- Anders Osborne
- Honeytribe
- The Lee Boys
- Los Straitjackets
- Billy Price Band
- Eilen Jewell
- Eric Tessmer Band
- Boogie Hustlers
- Jimmy Adler Band
- Boca Chica
- Tim Dabbs
- Corned Beef & Curry
- Good Brother Earl
- Moon River Ramblers
- Mark Dignam
- Rising Regina
- Dave DiStefano & the West Hills All-Stars
- The Bogarts
- The Weathered Road

== 2009 Flood City Music Festival Lineup ==
- The Derek Trucks Band
- Grace Potter and the Nocturnals
- Donna the Buffalo
- Ruthie Foster
- Seven Nations
- Bill Kirchen & the Hammer of the Honky-Tonk Gods
- Kane Welch Kaplin
- Scott Blasey
- Scrapomatic
- Clumsy Lovers
- Todd Wolfe
- Ernie Hawkins
- Bill Deasy
- Kristi Rose & Fats Kaplin
- Ben Hardt Acoustic
- The NewLanders
- Bob Banerjee & Friends
- Gerry Stanek
- Gypsy Dave & the Stumpjumpers
- Bill Toms
- Joy Ike
- The Turpentiners
- Brad Yoder
- Maddie Georgi
- Heather Kropf
- Jazz In Your Face
- Endless Mike & the Beagle Club
- Miner Swing Quartet
- Tree
- Whiskey River Panhandlers

== 2008 AmeriServ Johnstown Folkfest Lineup ==
- Jason & the Scorchers
- Del Castillo
- Tom Russell
- Webb Wilder & the Beatnecks
- Dwayne Dopsie & the Zydeco Hellraisers
- Amy LaVere
- Jason Ricci & New Blood
- Shannon Whitworth
- Big Sam's Funky Nation
- Deke Dickerson & the Ecco-Fonics
- Barrence Whitfield
- Stacie Collins
- Jordan Valentine & the Sunday Saints
- Born Again Floozies
- Dallas Wayne
- Jason Ringenberg
- Tim Dabbs
- Red Collar
- The Marauders
- Arty Hill and the Long Gone Daddies
- Dubmissive
- Aran
- Rusty Gun Revival
- Jazz In Your Face
- Beagle Brothers

== 2007 AmeriServ Johnstown Folkfest Lineup ==
- A. J. Croce
- The Tossers
- Dwayne Dopsie & the Zydeco Hellraisers
- Slavic Soul Party!
- Eric Lindell
- Scott Miller & the Commonwealth
- Bill Kirchen
- Tres Chicas
- Too Slim and the Taildraggers
- Druhá Tráva
- Last Train Home
- James Talley
- Bill Deasy
- Gigi Dover & The Big Love
- The Marauders
- Jimmy Adler
- Grinning Mob
- McKay Brothers
- Jimmy Sapienza & 5 Guys Named Moe
- Jennifer Drummey & the Small Band
- Jazz In Your Face

== 2006 AmeriServ Johnstown Folkfest Lineup ==
- Balkan Beat Box
- The Recipe
- Sleepy LaBeef
- Bonerama
- Terrance Simien & the Zydeco Experience
- Maia Sharp
- The Lee Boys
- Billy Price Band
- The Irish Descendants
- Joe Grushecky & the Houserockers
- Eric Tessmer Band
- Those Darn Accordions
- Doll Hospital
- Gamble Brothers Band
- Will Hawkins
- Mark Dignam
- Tim Dabbs
- Rusty Gun Revival
- The Gospel Lights
- Russell Lauf Band
- Rachel Allen
- Jazz in Your Face

== 2005 AmeriServ Johnstown Folkfest Lineup ==
- Sharon Jones & The Dap-Kings
- Wanda Jackson
- Rosie Flores
- Brave Combo
- Cephas & Wiggins
- Jason Ringenberg
- Lil' Brian & the Zydeco Travelers
- Chandler Travis Philharmonic
- Paul Cebar & the Milwaukeeans
- Red Elvises
- Redbird
- Peter Mulvey
- Kris Delmhorst
- Jeffrey Foucault
- The Kissers
- The Greyhounds
- The Gospel Lights
- "Farmer Jason" Ringenberg
- Soda Jerk
- Tim Dabbs
- Jazz in Your Face
- Angelo M
- Russell Lauf Band
- The Rhinelanders

== 2004 AmeriServ Johnstown Folkfest Lineup ==
- Seven Nations
- Chubby Carrier and the Bayou Swamp Band
- Jimmy Sturr & His Orchestra
- Walter "Wolfman" Washington & The Roadmasters
- Chris Smither
- Big Sandy & His Fly-Rite Boys
- Bill Kirchen
- Barrence Whitfield & The Savages
- The Recipe
- Hot Club Sandwich
- Anne McCue
- Two Dollar Pistols
- Ernie Hawkins
- Big Leg Emma
- The Gospel Lights
- Del Sinchak Band
- Little Buddy
- The Mavens
- Grinning Mob
- The NewLanders
- Jazz In Your Face

== 2003 AmeriServ Johnstown Folkfest Lineup ==
- The Louisiana Blues Throwdown featuring Harry Hypolite, Mathilda Jones, Eric Lindell and the Marc Stone Band
- Alex Torres y los Reyes Latinos
- The Prodigals
- Those Darn Accordions
- Wayne "The Train" Hancock
- Deke Dickerson and the Ecco-Fonics
- The Cool John Ferguson Band
- Red Meat
- Chandler Travis Philharmonic
- Two High String Band
- Caroline Herring
- Cootie Stark
- Tarbox Ramblers
- Peter Mulvey
- Jazz in Your Face
- Del Sinchak
- The Newlanders
- The Delaneys
- Ribbon Grass
- John Charney with White Mojo and Friends
- John Stevens' Doubleshot
- The Johnstown Button Box Band
- Polka Express

== 2002 AmeriServ Johnstown Folkfest Lineup ==
- Terrance Simien and the Mallet Playboys
- Asylum Street Spankers
- Bio Ritmo
- Robbie Fulks
- Michelle Willson and the Evil Gal Orchestra
- The Campbell Brothers
- Greg Trooper
- Ernie Hawkins
- Hot Club Sandwich
- Countdown Quartet
- Dog Run Boys
- Hooley
- Boilermaker Jazz Band
- Tim Dabbs
- Jolly Joe and the Bavarians

== 2001 AmeriServ Johnstown Folkfest Lineup ==
- Southern Culture on the Skids
- Nathan and the Zydeco Cha-Chas
- Jimmy Thackery and the Drivers
- Pucho & His Latin Soul Brothers
- Acoustic Syndicate
- Bonnie Rideout
- Ray Condo and the Ricochets
- Barrence Whitfield and the Groove Juice Symphony
- Dallas Wayne and the Hardcases
- Christy McWilson
- Hugh Feeley and Talk is Cheap
- Walt Wagner and the Polka Serenaders
- Die Schlauberger
- Simple Gifts
- Dead Irish Blues Band
- The Fabulous Gunslingers
- Gospel Lights

== 2000 AmeriServ Johnstown Folkfest Lineup ==
- Buckwheat Zydeco
- The Seldom Scene
- Miss Lavelle White
- Those Darn Accordions
- The Prodigals
- Chris Smither
- Ronnie Dawson
- Wendell Rivera's Latin Jazz All-Stars
- Tim Dabbs
- The Irish Descendants
- Earthtones
- Dead Irish Blues
- Crusade with Ed Biegaj

== 1999 AmeriServ Johnstown Folkfest Lineup ==
- Alex Torres and the Latin Kings
- Sleepy LaBeef
- Cephas & Wiggins
- The Holmes Brothers
- Don Walser and the Pure Texas Band
- Neil Anderson and Full Circle
- Jimmy Sapienza and Five Guys Named Moe
- Rank Outsiders
- Heather Eatman
- The Hot Club of Cowtown
- Hart-Rouge

== 1998 AmeriServ Johnstown Folkfest Lineup ==
- Walter "Wolfman" Washington
- Austin Lounge Lizards
- Terrance Simien and the Mallet Playboys
- Corey Harris
- Mamou
- Cherish the Ladies
- Asylum Street Spankers
- Trout Fishing in America
- Steel Impressions
- Jimmy Sapienza and the Swingmeisters
- Bill Bevac Band
- Mon Gumbo

== 1997 AmeriServ Johnstown Folkfest Lineup ==
- Laurie Lewis and Grant Street
- Tab Benoit
- Los Pinkys
- Solas
- Rank Outsiders
- Lil Brian and the Zydeco Travelers
- The Gathering Field
- Del Sinchak
- The Englishmen
- Code Blue
- Kevin Roth

== 1996 AmeriServ Johnstown Folkfest Lineup ==
- Fat Possum Mississippi Juke Joint Caravan with R. L. Burnside, Dave Thompson and Junior Kimbrough
- The Persuasions
- Nathan and the Zydeco Cha-Chas
- Beaver Creek
- Don Walser and the Pure Texas Band
- Clan Na Gael
- Galla & Dan
- Earthtones
- Grooveyard
- The Braxmen
- Eddie and the Slovenes

== 1995 AmeriServ Johnstown Folkfest Lineup ==
- Maggie Christl
- Green Fields of America
- C.J. Chenier and the Red Hot Louisiana Band
- Tim & Mollie O'Brien and The O'Boys
- Sleepy LaBeef
- The Dixie Hummingbirds
- Phillip Fankhauser and the Checkerboard Blues Band
- The Grace Family
- Heather Eatman
- Joe Grkman Band

== 1994 AmeriServ Johnstown Folkfest Lineup ==
- Johnny Clyde Copeland
- Jimmy Thackery and the Drivers
- Chubby Carrier and the Bayou Swamp Band
- Alex Torres and the Latin Kings
- J.D. Crowe and the New South
- Lenny Gomulka's Chicago Push
- Jimmy Sapienza and Five Guys Named Moe
- Casco Bay Tummlers
- John Bagnato Quartet

== 1993 Johnstown Folkfest Lineup ==
- Clarence "Gatemouth" Brown
- Kukuruza
- Áine Minogue
- Rockin' Dopsie and the Zydeco Twisters
- Queen Bee & the Blue Hornet Band
- Glorius Rebirth
- Drums for Peace
- Dynabrass
- Douglas Miller

== 1992 National Folk Festival Lineup ==
- Terrance Simien and the Mallet Playboys
- The Blind Boys of Alabama
- Fontella Bass
- Southern Scratch
- Warner Williams
- Eddie Pennington
- Melvin Wine
- Chatuye
- Shashmaqam
- Big Joe Duskin
- Brendon Mulvihill
- Gillis Brothers

== 1991 National Folk Festival Lineup ==
- The Fairfield Four
- Walter Mouton and the Scott Playboys
- Wayne Henderson
- Roman Ritachka
- Los Pleneros del Batey
- Ganga
- Ceilidh House
- Tony Ellis
- Etta Baker
- Sun Rhythm Section

== 1990 National Folk Festival Lineup ==
- The Holmes Brothers
- Lyman Enloe
- Liz Carroll
- Billy McComskey and Dáithí Sproule
- Otonowa
- Cephas & Wiggins
- Preston Frank and the Zydeco Family Band
- Moses Rascoe
- Charlie "Possum" Walden
- Bud Hudenski and the Corsairs
