= Yoder (disambiguation) =

Yoder is a surname originating in Switzerland. It may also refer to:

== People with the surname ==
- Ashley Yoder (born 1987), American mixed martial artist
- Brad Yoder (disambiguation), several people
- Carlin Yoder, American politician
- Christine Roy Yoder, American theologian
- Jeremy Yoder, American biologist and LGBT advocate
- John Yoder (disambiguation), several people
- Joseph Yoder (1872–1956), American educator, musicologist, and writer
- Kevin Yoder (born 1976), American politician
- Samuel S. Yoder, (1841–1921), American politician
- Shelli Yoder (born 1968), American politician
- Steve Yoder (born c. 1939), American basketball coach
- Todd Yoder (born 1978), American football player
- Walt Yoder (1914–1978), American jazz bassist

== Places ==
Places in the United States:

- Yoder, Colorado
- Yoder, Indiana
- Yoder, Kansas
- Yoder, Oregon
- Lower Yoder Township, Pennsylvania
- Upper Yoder Township, Pennsylvania
- Yoder, Wyoming

Places in Canada:

- Yoder, British Columbia

== See also ==
- Wisconsin v. Yoder, a landmark United States Supreme Court case
- Yoda, a character in Star Wars
