= Stacy Smith (news anchor) =

- Education: Marian College
- Occupation: Television news anchor
- Children: 2 children

Stacy Smith is a retired news anchor at CBS owned and operated KDKA-TV, a local television station based out of Pittsburgh, Pennsylvania. He was also a contributor to OnQ, a news magazine program that aired on WQED-TV.

== Education and career ==
Smith attended Marian College in Indiana and graduated in 1971, majoring in theatre and drama. Also in 1971, his broadcasting career began at WLBC-AM/FM in Muncie, Indiana. Then, he worked at WHAS-AM/FM/TV in Louisville, Kentucky and WIFE-AM in Indianapolis, Indiana. Stacy anchored the evening newscasts at WDAF-TV in Kansas City, Missouri, for six years before joining KDKA-TV, Pittsburgh in July 1983 as a reporter and anchor. While working at the station, he covered political conventions in 1984, 1988, and 1996 in depth. Smith has earned many awards as a news anchorman. Among these are a Mid-Atlantic Emmy Award, along with Patrice King Brown, also of KDKA, for their coverage of the 1994 crash of US Air Flight 427 near Aliquippa, Pennsylvania. He has also earned several other Emmy awards for news broadcasting. Smith assisted with several Emmy Award-winning special reports including "After the Miracle" (a report on life after organ transplantation) and "Generation X" (a report on the 30 and under age group). Smith has been honored as a co-anchor with awards from the Associated Press and United Press International, and for reports on Thomas Starzl and on Alzheimer's disease. Smith won the Bill Burns Award at the 2009 Art Rooney Award Dinner. Among Smith's major assignments while working as a reporter was his visit to the Vatican where he briefly spoke with Pope John Paul II.

He anchored for "KDKA-TV News" at 4 and 6 P.M. after turning over his noon anchoring duties to Kristine Sorensen in 2019. He retired on Wednesday, May 26, 2021, at the age of 72.

== Personal ==
At the age of six months, Smith was diagnosed with polio, and started his elementary school education in special schools for children recovering from the disease. He is rarely seen walking on camera.

Smith serves on the board of directors of the Harmarville Rehabilitations Center and is also active in the Three Rivers Council for Independent Living. He has previously served as the chairman of the board of directors of Family House of Pittsburgh.
