= Chasing Down a Spark =

Studio album by Bill Deasy
- Released: 2005

Chasing Down a Spark is the third solo release by recording artist Bill Deasy although it is the second after formally leaving The Gathering Field. Chasing Down a Spark follows his 2003 release Good Day No Rain and his first solo effort, Spring Lies Waiting, was recorded as a side project while still with The Gathering Field.

Chasing Down a Spark was produced by Kevin Salem and mixed by Joe Blaney. The CD features guest appearances by Rachael Yamagata, Maia Sharp, Donnie Iris and The Clarks' Scott Blasey and Rob James.

== Track listing ==
1. Until I Get It Right
2. Something So Hard
3. Levi
4. Sweet Forgiveness
5. Naked
6. Wishing Well
7. Pass Me On
8. Fireflies
9. Now That I Know What it Means
10. Pale
11. And I Wait
12. Turn Your Light On
