= KDKA-TV =

Television station in Pittsburgh

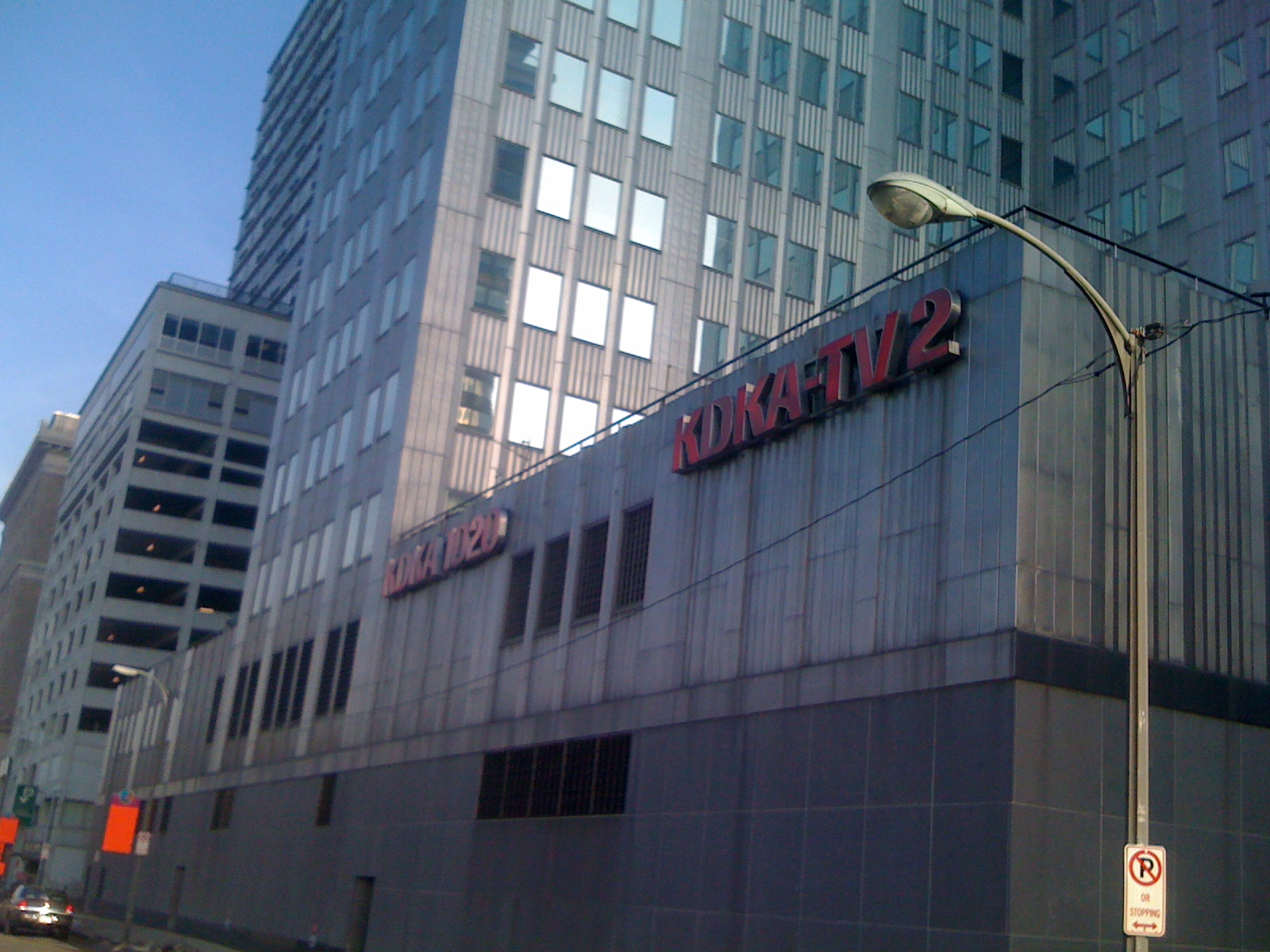
- Pittsburgh, Pennsylvania; United States
- Channels: Digital: 25 (UHF); Virtual: 2
- Branding: KDKA-TV; CBS Pittsburgh; KDKA News; CBS News Pittsburgh

Programming
- Affiliations: 2.1: CBS; for others, see § Subchannels

Ownership
- Owner: CBS Television Stations; (CBS Broadcasting Inc.)
- Sister stations: WPKD-TV

History
- First air date: January 11, 1949
- Former call signs: WDTV (1949–1955)
- Former channel number: Analog: 3 (VHF, 1949–1952), 2 (VHF, 1952–2009)
- Former affiliations: DuMont (1949–1956); NBC (secondary, 1949–1957); ABC (secondary, 1949–1958)
- Call sign meaning: derived from KDKA radio

Technical information
- Licensing authority: FCC
- Facility ID: 25454
- ERP: 1,000 kW
- HAAT: 311 m (1,020 ft)
- Transmitter coordinates: 40°29′38″N 80°1′9″W

Links
- Public license information: Public file; LMS
- Website: www.cbsnews.com/pittsburgh/

KDKA-TV (channel 2), branded as CBS Pittsburgh, is a television station in Pittsburgh, Pennsylvania, United States. It is owned and operated by the CBS television network through its CBS Television Stations division, and is sister to WPKD-TV (channel 19), an independent station. The two outlets share studios at the Gateway Center in Downtown Pittsburgh; KDKA-TV's transmitter is located in the city's Perry North neighborhood.

== History ==
=== Radio origins (1917–1949) ===
KDKA's establishment was part of post-World War I efforts of Pittsburgh-based Westinghouse Electric Corporation's ambition to expand commercial operations in the radio industry. During World War I, Westinghouse received government contracts to develop radio transmitters and receivers for military use, and also received permission to operate research radio transmitters located at its East Pittsburgh plant and at the home of one of its lead engineers, Frank Conrad, in nearby Wilkinsburg. KDKA eventually became affiliated with the NBC Blue Network.

=== Transition to television (1949–1954) ===
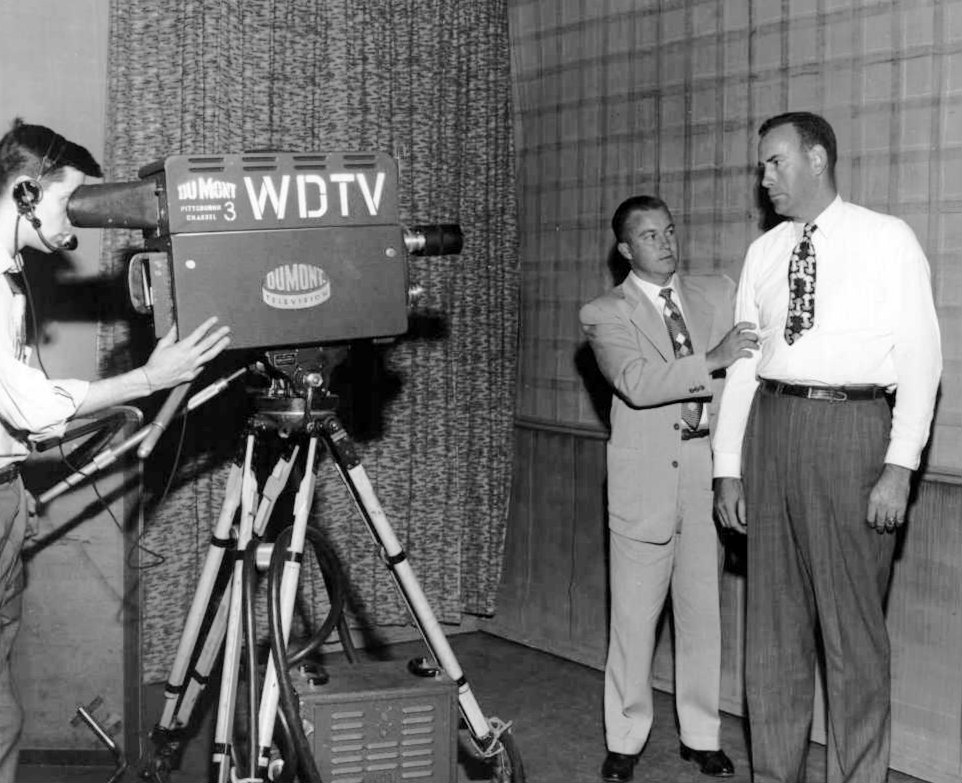
WDTV broadcast of We, the People on April 18, 1952. The guest is New York Yankees player Bill Bevens.

The station signed on as WDTV on January 11, 1949, as a primary affiliate of the former DuMont Television Network, while carrying secondary affiliations with CBS, NBC, and ABC. It originally broadcast on channel 3 and was owned and operated by DuMont parent company Allen B. DuMont Laboratories. It was the 51st television station in the U.S., the third and last DuMont-owned station to sign on the air (behind WABD (now WNYW) in New York City and WTTG in Washington, D.C.), and the first owned-and-operated station in the Commonwealth of Pennsylvania. To mark the occasion, a live television special aired that day from 8:30 to 11 p.m. on WDTV, which began with a one-hour local program broadcast from Syria Mosque in Pittsburgh. The remainder of the show featured live segments from DuMont, CBS, NBC, and ABC with Arthur Godfrey, Milton Berle, DuMont host Ted Steele, and many other celebrities.

The station also represented a milestone in the television industry, providing the link between the Midwestern and East Coast stations which included 13 other cities able to receive live telecasts from Boston to St. Louis for the first time. WDTV was one of the last stations to receive a construction permit before the Federal Communications Commission (FCC)-imposed four-year freeze on new television station licenses.

When the release of the FCC's Sixth Report and Order ended the license freeze in 1952, DuMont was forced to give up its channel 3 allocation to alleviate interference with nearby stations broadcasting on the frequency, notably NBC-owned WNBK (now WKYC) in Cleveland, which itself moved to the frequency to avoid interference with stations in Columbus and Detroit. WDTV moved its facilities to channel 2 on November 23, 1952; WPSU-TV would later sign on with the channel 3 frequency for the Johnstown–Altoona market. Shortly after moving, it was the first station in the country (and also, in the world) to broadcast 24 hours a day, seven days a week, advertising that its 1–7 a.m. Swing Shift Theatre served the "200,000 workers [in their viewing area] who finished shift work at midnight". DuMont's network of stations on coaxial cable stretched from Boston to St. Louis. These stations were linked together via AT&T's coaxial cable feed with the sign-on of WDTV allowing the network to broadcast live programming to all the stations at the same time. Stations not yet connected to the coaxial cable received kinescope recordings via physical delivery.

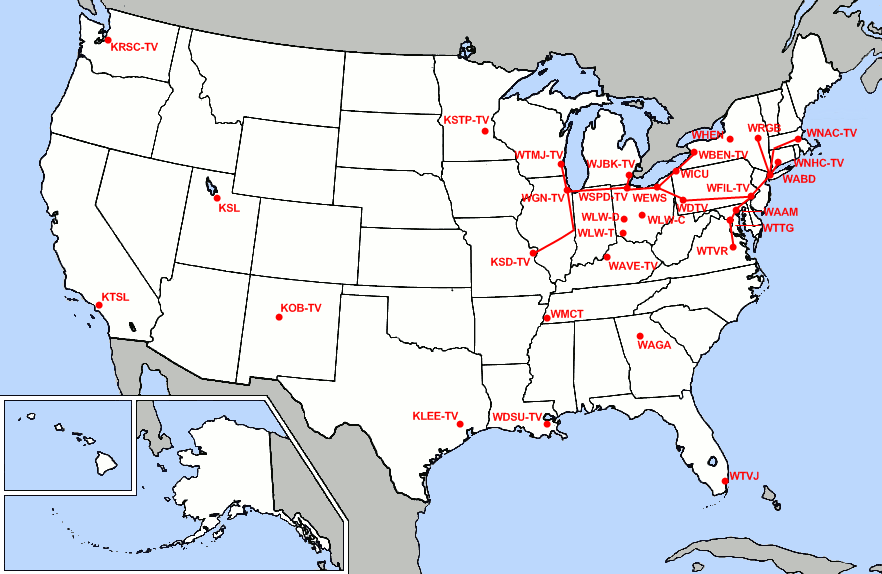
The DuMont Television Network in 1949.

==== Dealing with competition ====
Until the end of the freeze, WDTV's only competition came in the form of distant signals from stations in Johnstown, Altoona, Wheeling and Youngstown. However, Pittsburgh saw two UHF stations launch during 1953—ABC affiliate WENS (channel 16, later to become WINP-TV), and WKJF-TV (channel 53, later to become WPGH-TV), an independent station. At the time, UHF stations could not be viewed without the aid of an expensive set-top converter, and the picture quality was marginal at best with one. UHF stations in the area faced an additional problem because Pittsburgh is located in a somewhat rugged dissected plateau, and the reception of UHF stations is usually poor in such terrain. These factors played a role in the short-lived existences of both WKJF and WENS.

Although Pittsburgh was the sixth largest market in the country (behind New York City, Chicago, Los Angeles, Philadelphia and Washington/Baltimore), the other VHF stations in town were slow to develop. This was because the major cities in the Upper Ohio Valley are so close together that they must share the VHF band. After the FCC lifted the license freeze in 1952, it refused to grant any new commercial VHF construction permits to Pittsburgh in order to give the smaller cities in the area a chance to get on the air. WDTV had a de facto monopoly on Pittsburgh television. Like its sister stations WABD and WTTG, it was far stronger than the DuMont network as a whole. According to network general manager Ted Bergmann, WDTV brought in $4 million a year, which was more than enough to keep the network afloat. Owning the only readily viewable station in such a large market gave DuMont considerable leverage in getting its programs cleared in large markets where it did not have an affiliate. As CBS, NBC and ABC had secondary affiliations with WDTV, this was a strong incentive to stations in large markets to clear DuMont's programs or risk losing valuable advertising in the sixth-largest market. Also, NBC affiliates from Johnstown (WJAC-TV, channel 6) and Wheeling (WTRF-TV, channel 7) were able to be received in Pittsburgh and a CBS affiliate from Steubenville, Ohio (WSTV-TV, now WTOV-TV) was also able to be received there as well. CBS, in fact, actually attempted to purchase WSTV-TV's license before it went on the air and move its channel 9 allocation to Pittsburgh due to the close proximity between Pittsburgh and Steubenville (At the time less than an hour apart by car; the completion of the Penn-Lincoln Parkway in 1964 reduced that time to about a half-hour driving time today), but the FCC turned CBS down. The Wheeling/Steubenville TV market, despite its very close proximity to Pittsburgh and overlapping signals, remains a separate market by FCC standards today.

WDTV aired all DuMont network shows live and "cherry-picked" the best shows from the other networks, airing them on kinescope on an every-other-week basis. WDTV's sign-on was also significant because it was now possible to feed live programs from the East to the Midwest and vice versa. In fact, its second broadcast was the activation of the coaxial cable linking New York City and Chicago. It would be another two years before the West Coast received live programming, but this was the beginning of the modern era of network television.

=== As KDKA-TV (1954–present) ===
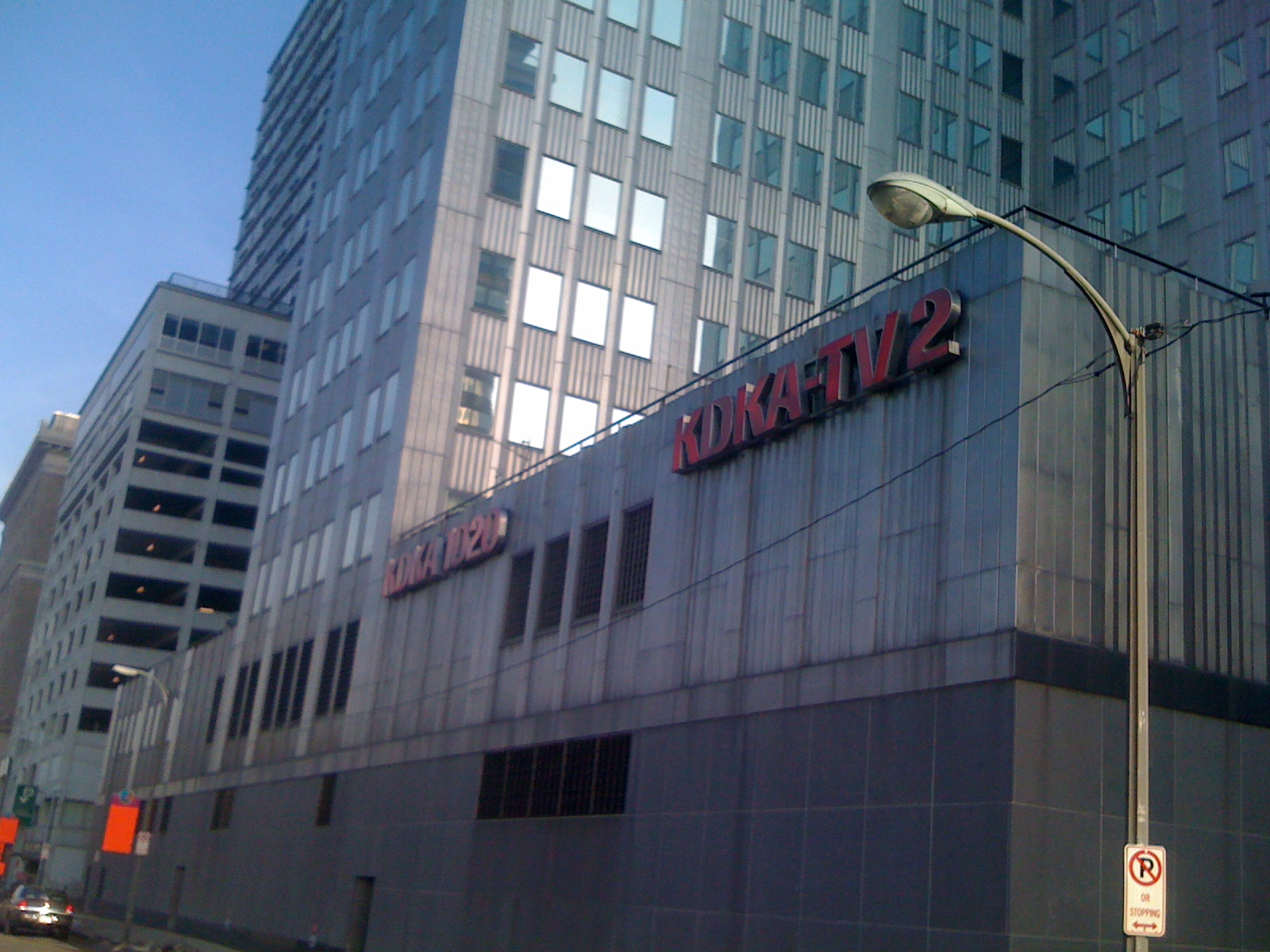
KDKA-TV's studio building at One Gateway Center in Pittsburgh. The station has been housed in this facility since 1956.

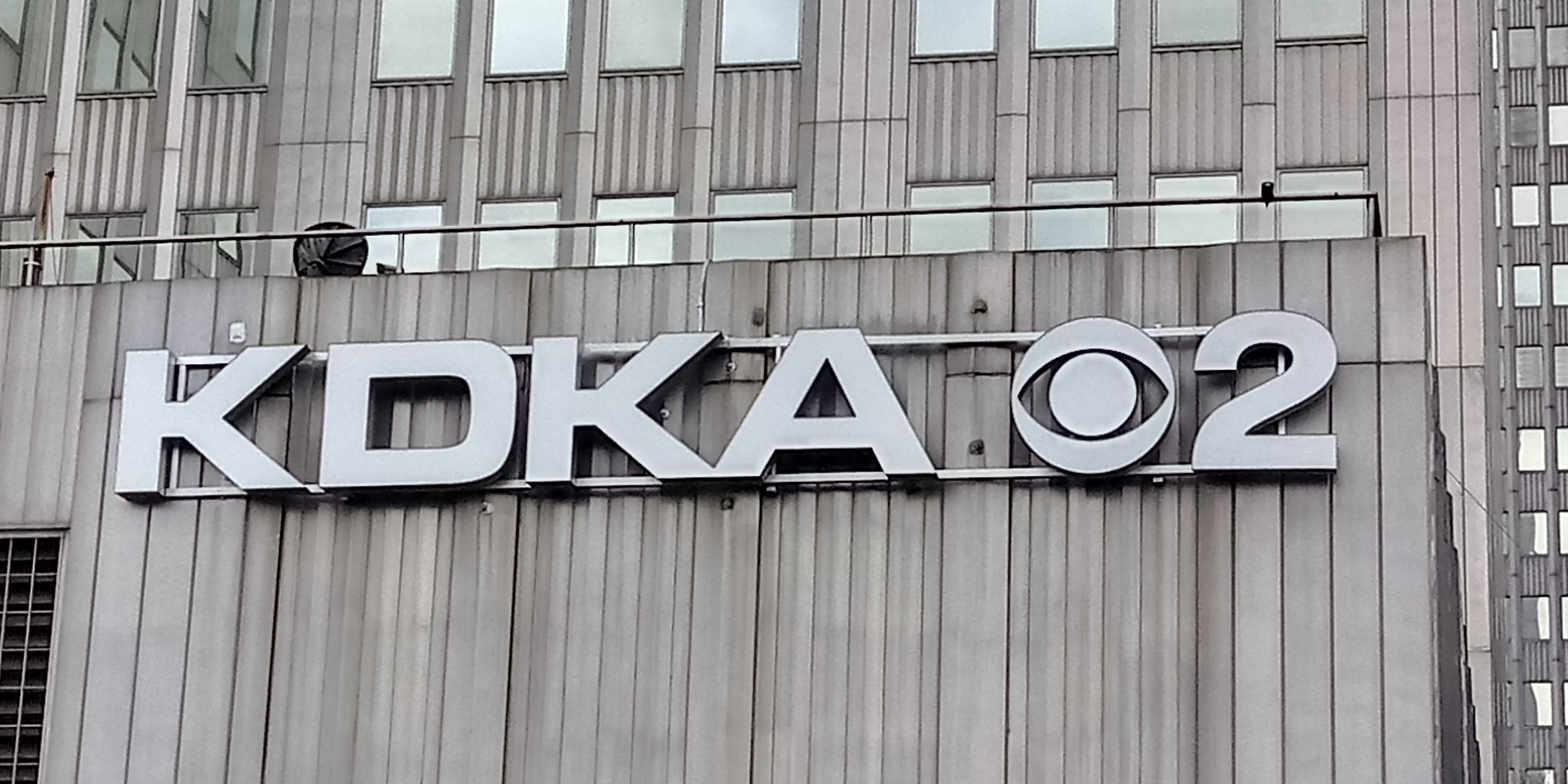
KDKA-TV's updated studio building signage put up in April 2019. KDKA radio moved to Green Tree in 2010.

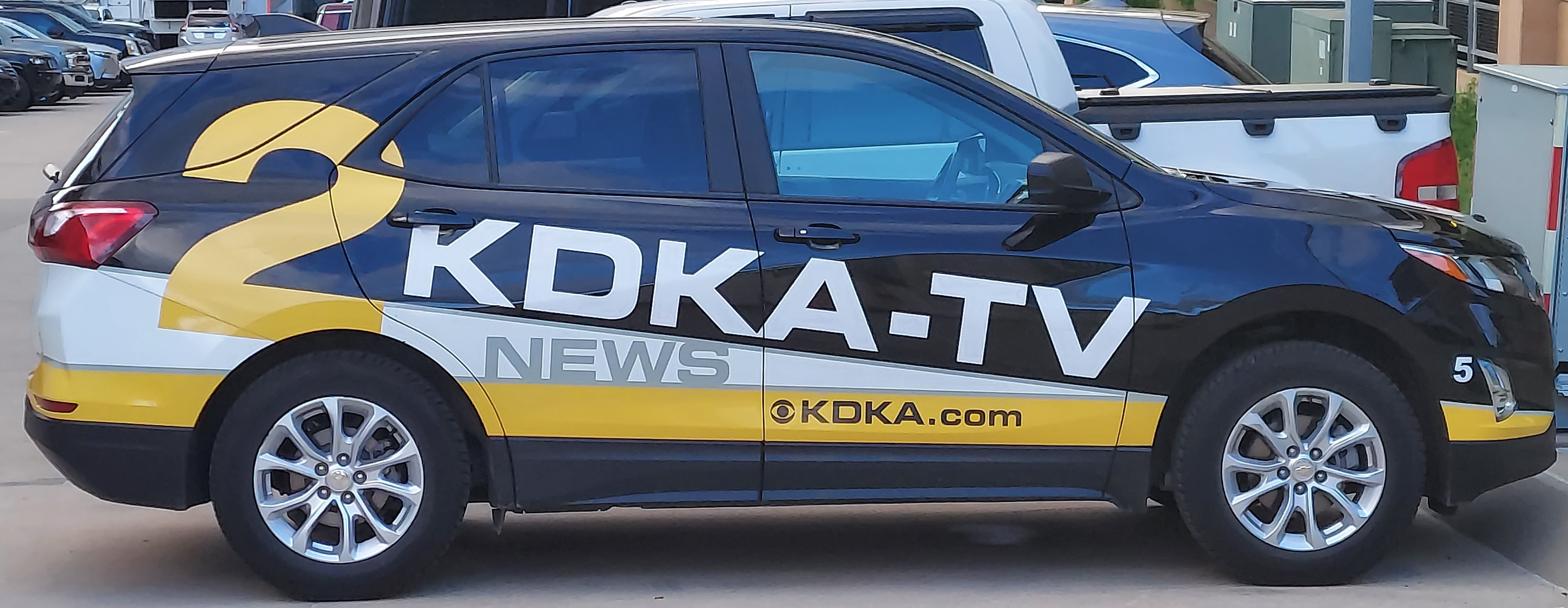
KDKA-TV's 2021 news truck, a Chevrolet Equinox, in Pittsburgh.

By 1954, DuMont was in serious financial trouble. Paramount Pictures, which owned a stake in DuMont, vetoed a merger with ABC, who had merged with Paramount's former theater division United Paramount Theaters a year before. A few years earlier, the FCC had ruled that Paramount controlled DuMont and there were still lingering questions about whether UPT had actually broken off from Paramount. Paramount did not want to risk the FCC's wrath.

Meanwhile, Westinghouse had been competing with local politicians to acquire the non-commercial channel 13 license from the FCC, as no other Pittsburgh-allocated VHF station would be signing on for the foreseeable future. After launching WBZ-TV in Boston in 1948 and purchasing two other television stations, Westinghouse was growing impatient with not having a station in its own home market. Before the freeze, Westinghouse was a shoo-in for the channel 6 license that would later be given to WJAC-TV in Johnstown after that station gave up the channel 13 allocation to Pittsburgh as part of the FCC's reallocation plan. Westinghouse later offered a compromise plan to the FCC, in which the commission would grant Westinghouse the channel 13 license; Westinghouse would then "share" the facility with the educational licensee. Finding the terms unacceptable, Pittsburgh attorney Leland Hazard called Westinghouse CEO Gwilym Price to ask him if he should give up on his fight for public television. Price said that Hazard should keep fighting for it, giving Westinghouse backing for the station that would eventually become WQED.

Westinghouse then turned its attention to WDTV, offering DuMont a then-record $9.75 million for the station in late 1954. Desperate for cash, DuMont promptly accepted Westinghouse's offer. While the sale gave DuMont a short-term cash infusion, it eliminated DuMont's leverage in getting clearances in other major markets. Within two years, the DuMont network was no more. Once the sale closed in January 1955, Westinghouse changed WDTV's call letters to KDKA-TV, after Westinghouse's pioneering radio station KDKA (1020 AM). As such, it became one of the few stations east of the Mississippi River with a "K" call sign.

As KDKA radio had long been an affiliate of the NBC Blue Network (Westinghouse was a co-founder of RCA, NBC's then-parent company), it was expected that KDKA-TV would eventually become a primary affiliate of the NBC television network. But the network was seeking to purchase Westinghouse's Philadelphia stations, KYW radio and WPTZ (now KYW-TV). When Westinghouse balked, NBC threatened to pull its programming from WPTZ and Boston's WBZ-TV unless Westinghouse agreed to trade its Philadelphia properties for NBC's radio and television properties in Cleveland. (Related to the trade, Westinghouse received a cross-station waiver from the FCC to own the Cleveland properties due to overlapping signals with KDKA radio and channel 2.) The decision would lead to an acrimonious relationship between Westinghouse and NBC in later years. Two years after the ownership change, channel 2 became a primary affiliate of the higher-rated CBS network instead. KDKA-TV retained secondary affiliations with NBC until WIIC-TV (channel 11, now WPXI) signed on in 1957, and ABC until WTAE-TV (channel 4) signed on in 1958. Despite the ending of its commercial VHF monopoly, KDKA-TV did welcome competitor WIIC-TV on the air. KDKA-TV became the flagship station of Westinghouse's broadcasting arm, Group W. During the late 1950s, KDKA-TV was briefly affiliated with the NTA Film Network, sharing the affiliation with WTAE-TV, WIIC-TV, and WQED. On November 22, 1963, newscaster Bill Burns provided almost three hours of live coverage after the shooting of President John F. Kennedy.

In 1994, Westinghouse was looking to make a group-wide affiliation deal for its stations as part of a larger plan to transform itself into a major media conglomerate after WJZ-TV lost its ABC affiliation to Scripps-owned WMAR-TV in an affiliation deal spurred by Fox's affiliation deal with New World Communications. Westinghouse negotiated with NBC and CBS for a deal. Had Westinghouse signed with NBC, KDKA-TV would affiliate itself with NBC 40 years after passing up the network, with the CBS affiliation going to WPXI, who had originally intended to affiliate itself with CBS until the NBC-Westinghouse feud started as well as channel 11's own sign-on problems in the 1950s. While NBC (the highest-rated network during much of the 1980s and 1990s) offered more money, CBS was interested in the programming opportunities Westinghouse offered, due to its own stagnation in programming at the time. CBS also offered a potential merger of their respective radio networks down the road (which ultimately happened), while NBC had abandoned radio in 1987. Ultimately, Westinghouse signed a long-term deal with CBS to convert the entire five-station Group W television unit to a group-wide CBS affiliation, making the Pittsburgh market one of the few major markets that were not affected by the affiliation switches.

In 1995, Westinghouse acquired CBS, making KDKA-TV a CBS owned-and-operated station, after four decades as being simply a CBS affiliate. In 1997, Westinghouse became CBS Corporation, which would then merge with Viacom (which had been Paramount's parent since 1994) in 2000, making KDKA-TV a sister station with Pittsburgh UPN affiliate WNPA-TV (channel 19, now independent station WPKD-TV). Five years later, Viacom became the new CBS Corporation and spun off a new Viacom. In May 2003, KDKA-TV retired the distinctive Group W font in its logo after 40 years, adopting a more standardized CBS branding identity.

In August 2007, KDKA-TV unveiled a new image campaign, entitled "Your Home", with music and lyrics performed by singer-songwriter Bill Deasy. The promo features scenes of Pittsburgh and its surrounding areas, as well as three of the station's personalities. In September 2007, the station unveiled another promo featuring the Joe Grushecky song "Coming Home". Later, a third spot, "Long Way Home", was introduced, featuring the voice of Kelsey Friday.

On February 2, 2017, CBS agreed to sell CBS Radio to Entercom (now Audacy), currently the fourth-largest radio broadcasting company in the United States. The sale was completed on November 17, 2017, and was conducted using a Reverse Morris Trust so that it was tax-free. While CBS shareholders retained a 72% ownership stake in the combined company, Entercom was the surviving entity, with KDKA radio and its sister stations now separated from KDKA-TV, though the three stations maintain a strong news and content sharing agreement.

On December 4, 2019, CBS Corporation and Viacom remerged into ViacomCBS (now Paramount Skydance).

On March 21, 2023, KDKA-TV adopted a new logo and on-air branding in accordance with the current CBS "deconstructed eye" corporate identity; the new brand maintains the "KDKA-TV News" title as a verbal brand alongside a standardized "CBS News Pittsburgh" logo. Though most of its sister stations went with the corporate blue/white color scheme as a default, the station instead went with a black and gold scheme, embolic of the primary and secondary colors used in the flag of Pittsburgh, along with the city's professional sports teams. Conversely, its sister station in Philadelphia, KYW-TV, went with a black and green motif matching that of the Philadelphia Eagles.

== Programming ==
Part of the 1995 affiliation agreement between CBS and Westinghouse included a deal to carry the entire CBS lineup in pattern, with no preemptions except for extended breaking news coverage or local news events. In the fall of 1995, channel 2 began running the entire CBS lineup in pattern, as it, and sister station KPIX-TV in San Francisco, were already affiliated with the network. However, unlike its rivals, KDKA-TV runs the weekday edition of the CBS Evening News a half-hour later, from 7 p.m. to 7:30 p.m. Eastern Time, due to its evening newscast running for three full hours from 4 to 7 p.m. The weekend editions usually air on Saturdays at 6:30 p.m. and Sundays at 6 p.m.

=== Preempted programming ===
Prior to 1995, channel 2 preempted moderate amounts of CBS programming. From the early 1960s to July 1990, the station did not clear As the World Turns, except for a brief period from December 1976 to October 1978. At the same time, WTAJ-TV in Altoona had run the program and was viewable in much of Pittsburgh itself and the eastern part of the market, and was even carried on many Pittsburgh-area cable systems well into the 1980s. Also, CBS affiliates WTOV-TV in Steubenville (until 1980) and WTRF-TV in Wheeling (from 1980) were viewable in Pittsburgh and points west. Until 1978, As the World Turns ran on WPGH and for a few years after that, it ran on WPTT-TV (channel 22). KDKA-TV also preempted the daytime game shows and reruns from CBS at various points during the 1970s. KDKA-TV was one of four CBS affiliates to preempt the 1974 film Death Wish on its television debut despite the network's 30+ cuts to its violent content; these affiliates objected not only to the remaining amount of violence in the film, but also to the apparent endorsement by the film of vigilante violence. The station also occasionally preempted other CBS prime time programs for a syndicated movie, local news special, or sports (during the years in which the station had broadcast rights to Pittsburgh Pirates baseball and Pittsburgh Penguins hockey). Weekend preemptions included a small portion of Saturday and Sunday morning cartoons, and Sunday morning religious programs. In 1993, KDKA-TV stopped running CBS This Morning and instead ran Disney's syndicated cartoon block. Despite the preemptions, CBS was mostly satisfied with KDKA-TV, as it was the far-and-away market leader in Pittsburgh owing to its eight-year head-start on its main competitors.

=== Syndicated and local talk shows ===
As a Westinghouse-owned station, KDKA-TV carried the numerous syndicated talk shows produced by its subsidiary Group W Productions, including The Merv Griffin Show, The Mike Douglas Show, Evening Magazine, and Hour Magazine. It also produced a local program titled Pittsburgh Talks.

Later in the 1980s, KDKA-TV carried the early seasons of the syndicated Jeopardy! and Wheel of Fortune, though in separate time slots as opposed to the standard practice of airing them back-to-back; the station lost both shows to WPXI in 1988. Channel 2 also aired another King World Productions-distributed program, The Oprah Winfrey Show, during its first nine nationally syndicated seasons (1986–1995), airing the show weekdays at 5 p.m. In 1989, KDKA-TV acquired the rights to The Sally Jessy Raphael Show, airing it weekdays at 9 a.m. and Donahue weekdays at 4 p.m., respectively. However, due to the poor ratings of Donahue in the Pittsburgh market, KDKA-TV showed strong interest in new talk shows.

Sally and Donahue moved to WTAE-TV in 1993, and two years later, KDKA-TV debuted a 5 p.m. newscast, at which point Oprah also moved to WTAE-TV, airing at 4 p.m. In 1997, The Ricki Lake Show moved to WPGH-TV and Sally returned to KDKA-TV, and once again was given the 9 a.m. time slot, where it remained on and off until its cancellation in 2002. Sally was a success in the Pittsburgh area, even beating Montel Williams on WPXI in the 1990s. A revamped version of Pittsburgh 2day Live replaced Sally.

KDKA-TV aired The Rosie O'Donnell Show during its entire six-year run at the 4 p.m. time slot. After the show ended its run in 2002, rather than airing its replacement (the short-lived Caroline Rhea Show, which aired on WPXI), KDKA-TV became the first station in the Pittsburgh market to air a 4 p.m. newscast.

From August 2020 to March 2023, Dr. Phil was the only syndicated show airing on KDKA-TV in any capacity outside of the graveyard slot between the post-late fringe and breakfast television, as the station aired either CBS network programming or local news throughout the day except for the 3–4 p.m. slot for Dr. Phil, with sister station WPKD now airing a heavy syndicated schedule during daytime programming. With Dr. Phil ending its run, rather than expanding its evening newscasts to five hours, KDKA-TV launched a new afternoon talk-show spinoff of PTL called Talk Pittsburgh on March 20, 2023. Dr. Phil has since aired on sister station WPKD-TV.

=== Pittsburgh Steelers ===
As CBS holds the broadcast contract with the NFL to show games involving AFC teams, KDKA-TV has been the official broadcaster of most Pittsburgh Steelers games since 1998, and serves as the team's flagship station. The team's preseason games that are not nationally televised are also shown on KDKA-TV. KDKA-TV began its relationship with the Steelers in 1962, when CBS first started the leaguewide television package. The Steelers are one of three AFC teams that predate the AFC's basis league, the American Football League, and so KDKA-TV, and not WTAE-TV or WIIC-TV (now WPXI), carried Steelers road games (home games were blacked out locally under all circumstances until 1973, when sold-out home games began to be allowed on local television)—the AFL had television contracts with ABC, and later, NBC.

Due to the NFL rules of the time, after the AFL-NFL merger (and with it, the Steelers move to the newly formed AFC), KDKA-TV did not broadcast any Steelers games from 1970 to 1972 (Steeler games were exclusive to what was then WIIC-TV in that period). Beginning in 1973, KDKA-TV was allowed to air any Steelers games in which they hosted a team from the National Football Conference, which contained most of the old-line NFL teams. KDKA-TV also broadcast two Steeler championship wins, Super Bowl X in 1976 and Super Bowl XIV in 1980. Since the Steelers have sold out every home game starting in 1972, no blackouts have been required. In the meantime, from 1970 to 1997, channel 11 aired most Steelers games (and exclusively from 1970 to 1972).

When the NFC package moved from CBS to Fox in 1994, WPGH-TV aired the Steelers games that had before aired on KDKA-TV, leaving the senior station without Steelers games for four years. Today, and in general since 1970, the only exceptions to all the above are when the Steelers play at night. Their Monday Night Football games have always aired locally on WTAE-TV, first when ABC had the rights, and since 2006, on ESPN. WTAE-TV also aired simulcasts of their games aired as part of ESPN Sunday Night Football from 1987 to 2005 (since 2006, WPXI airs Steelers games when they play on Sunday nights). The NFL requires games on cable channels to be simulcast over-the-air in the markets of the participating teams (again with the home team's broadcast subject to blackout). WTAE-TV has simulcast ESPN-aired games because ESPN is 20% owned by WTAE-TV's owners, Hearst Corporation—their ABC stations have right of first refusal for these simulcasts. Games on TNT and NFL Network have aired on various stations in the area. In 2014, with the NFL's new 'cross-flex' broadcast rules, any games that involve the Steelers playing another AFC opponent (or NFC opponent on the road) scheduled to air on KDKA-TV can now air on Fox station WPGH-TV.

=== News operation ===
KDKA-TV presently broadcasts 43 hours of locally produced newscasts each week (with seven hours each weekday, 4 1/2 hours on Saturdays and 3 1/2 hours on Sundays); KDKA-TV also produces 2 hours, 35 minutes of local newscasts each weekday for its independent sister station WPKD-TV, in the form of a two-hour extension of KDKA-TV's weekday morning newscast at 7 a.m., and a nightly 35-minute newscast at 10 p.m.

Under Westinghouse ownership, KDKA-TV used the Eyewitness News branding for its newscasts, pioneered by sister station KYW-TV. That, combined with being locally owned, saw the station dominate its local news ratings for decades, though WTAE-TV became more competitive in the 1970s with its Action News format (which it still uses the branding for today), as well as signing over ex-KDKA-TV talent Paul Long and Don Cannon and a general larger investment in its news department by its owner Hearst Communications.

The 1990s saw many changes to the news department at KDKA-TV, notably Westinghouse's purchase of CBS and moving its headquarters to New York City, thus losing its locally owned status and therefore its flagship station status to WCBS-TV and KCBS-TV. Additionally, the Eyewitness News branding was dropped on April 22, 1996, in favor of simply KDKA-TV News. By this point, WPXI had become more competitive with KDKA-TV and WTAE-TV due to its own investment into the news department back in the 1980s by its owner Cox Media Group, leading to a spirited three-way battle for first place in a market KDKA-TV once dominated.

In November 1997, KDKA-TV and the Pittsburgh Post-Gazette launched a weekly public affairs program called KD/PG Sunday Edition. It succeeded the Post-Gazette's show The Editors, produced by WQED, which was discontinued in the summer of 1997.

In 2001, KDKA-TV began producing a 10 p.m. newscast on WNPA (now WPKD-TV); in 2005, it added a two-hour weekday morning newscast from 7 to 9 a.m. on that station (which was later reduced to one hour from 7 to 8 a.m., but in 2019 the 8 a.m. hour was restored).

On June 16, 2009, KDKA-TV began broadcasting its local newscasts in high definition.

In January 2019, the station fired an employee who programmed a lower third graphic to refer to New England Patriots quarterback Tom Brady as a "known cheater" during a report on Super Bowl LIII.

KDKA-TV launched a streaming news service, CBSN Pittsburgh (a localized version of the national CBSN service) on March 5, 2020, as part of a rollout of similar services across the CBS-owned stations. It was rebranded to CBS News Pittsburgh in early 2022.

On August 17, 2020, KDKA premiered a new weekday news program at 7:30 p.m., replacing Extra, which is still seen overnights. This competes against WTAE-TV's 7 p.m. newscast on its Cozi TV subchannel, leaving KDKA-TV the only station in the Pittsburgh market to air a newscast during the Prime Time Access Hour on its main signal. On January 8, 2024, KDKA-TV premiered an 8 p.m. newscast on WPKD to replace CW network programming after Paramount Global's deal with Nexstar Media Group. KDKA-TV aired its final 8 p.m. newscast on WPKD on July 25, 2025.

==== Notable current on-air staff ====
- Charlie Batch – Steelers analyst
- Chris Hoke – Steelers analyst
- Arthur Moats – Steelers analyst
- John Shumway – anchor/reporter (1988–present)

==== Notable former on-air staff ====
- Susan Barnett – anchor (1999–2003)
- Patrice King Brown – anchor and host of Pittsburgh 2Day (1978–2011)
- Bill Burns – anchor (1953–1989)
- Patti Burns – anchor/reporter (1974–1997)
- Don Cannon – anchor/reporter (1999–2008)
- Jon Delano – money and politics reporter (1994–2024)
- Rehema Ellis – began broadcast career at KDKA-TV
- Marty Griffin – investigative and consumer assistance reporter ("Get Marty")
- Donna Hanover – hosted Evening Magazine (1977–1980)
- Ron Klink – weekend anchor/reporter (1977–1991)
- Dennis Miller – contributor and guest host of Evening Magazine
- Josh Miller (born 1970), American football player and football analyst
- Paul Moyer – anchor/reporter (1971)
- Ron Olsen – reporter/talk show host (1976–1979)
- Larry Richert – anchor and weatherman (1988–2001)
- John Sanders – sports anchor
- Stacy Smith – anchor (1983–2021)
- John Steigerwald – sports anchor (1985–2007)
- Paul Steigerwald – sports reporter (1987–1998)
- Dick Stockton – sports reporter (1967–1971)
- Brian Sussman – weatherman (1987)
- Marie Torre – anchor/reporter (1962–1977)

== Technical information ==
=== Subchannels ===
The station's signal is multiplexed:

Subchannels of KDKA-TV
Subchannel	Res.	Short name	Programming
2.1	1080i	KDKA-HD	CBS
2.2	480i	StartTV	Start TV
2.3	480i	DABL	Dabl
2.4	480i	365BLK	365BLK
2.5	480i	Catchy	Catchy Comedy

=== Analog-to-digital conversion ===
KDKA-TV ended regular programming on its analog signal, over VHF channel 2, on June 12, 2009, the official date on which full-power television stations in the United States transitioned from analog to digital broadcasts under federal mandate, during that night's broadcast of the Late Show with David Letterman. The station showed the "High Flight" video clip, and a compilation of their analog history with "The Star-Spangled Banner" as background music, before signing off with DuMont test card and original name. As part of the SAFER Act, KDKA-TV kept its analog signal on the air until July 12 to inform viewers of the digital television transition through a loop of public service announcements from the National Association of Broadcasters. On June 17, 2009, during the nightlight period, KDKA-TV temporarily resumed regular programming to air severe weather coverage. The station's digital signal continued to broadcast on its pre-transition UHF channel 25, using virtual channel 2.

In July 2009, the station applied to the FCC to operate two repeater signals: channel 31 in Morgantown, West Virginia, and channel 40 in Johnstown.
