= Hold Your Tongue =

Studio album by Alter Natives
- Released: 1986
- Recorded: Radio Tokyo (Los Angeles, CA)
- Genre: Jazz fusion, punk rock
- Length: 35:15
- Label: SST (075)
- Producer: Alter Natives

Alter Natives chronology
Hold Your Tongue (1986)	Group Therapy (1988)

Professional ratings
Review scores
Source	Rating
Allmusic	3/5 stars

Hold Your Tongue is the debut studio album of Alter Natives, released in 1986 by SST Records.

== Track listing ==
All music is composed by Chris Bopst, Greg Ottinger, Jim Thomson and Eric Ungar.

Side one
No.	Title	Length
1.	"Sunset"	2:02
2.	"The Nipple Factor"	2:23
3.	"Blood on the Highway"	1:23
4.	"Sole"	2:45
5.	"Pit Rye Thumb"	0:50
6.	"Firewater/Auxiliary Drain"	3:01
7.	"Over the Counter-Culture"	4:23

Side two
No.	Title	Length
1.	"701"	1:48
2.	"Paraquot"	1:14
3.	"Circular Motion"	1:53
4.	"Chicken Box"	1:25
5.	"House of Tofu"	2:00
6.	"Jesus Goes to Straight"	1:19
7.	"Out of My Brain"	1:25
8.	"Living on Starch"	2:57
9.	"Stinky Hole"	4:27

== Personnel ==
Adapted from the Hold Your Tongue liner notes.

Alter Natives

- Chris Bopst – bass guitar
- Greg Ottinger – guitar
- Jim Thomson – drums
- Eric Ungar – saxophone, flute

Production and additional personnel

- Alter Natives – production
- Richard Andrews – recording
- Eric Bopst – illustrations
- John Golden – mastering
- Ethan James – mixing, recording

== Release history ==
Region	Date	Label	Format	Catalog
United States	1986	SST	CS, LP	SST 075
