= Buzz (Alter Natives album) =

Studio album by Alter Natives
- Released: August 4, 1989
- Recorded: December 1988 – January 1989
- Studio: Floodzone Studios (Richmond, VA)
- Genre: Jazz fusion, progressive rock
- Length: 37:08
- Label: SST (245)
- Producer: Alter Natives, Adam Green

Alter Natives chronology
Group Therapy (1988)	Buzz (1989)

Professional ratings
Review scores
Source	Rating
Allmusic	4/5 stars

Buzz is the third and final studio album by Alter Natives, released on August 4, 1989 by SST Records.

== Track listing ==
All music is composed by Chris Bopst, Greg Ottinger and Jim Thomson.

No.	Title	Length
1.	"Pudgy"	3:47
2.	"½ Cheek Sneek"	6:40
3.	"Sex Face"	7:03
4.	"Nubbing"	8:10
5.	"Black Hole"	11:28

== Personnel ==
Adapted from the Buzz liner notes.

Alter Natives

- Chris Bopst – bass guitar
- Greg Ottinger – guitar
- Jim Thomson – drums

Additional musicians'

- Steve Finberg – percussion
- Joseph J – vocals (5)
- Paul Watson – trumpet (1)

Production and design

- Alter Natives – production, engineering
- Fred German – cover art
- Adam Green – production, engineering
- John Morand – assistant engineer

== Release history ==
Region	Date	Label	Format	Catalog
United States	1989	SST	CD, LP	SST 245
