= Group Therapy (Alter Natives album) =

Studio album by Alter Natives
- Released: June 20, 1988
- Recorded: October – November 1987
- Studio: Radio Active Audio (Richmond, VA)
- Genre: Jazz fusion, punk rock
- Length: 42:06
- Label: SST (185)
- Producer: Adam Green

Alter Natives chronology
Hold Your Tongue (1986)	Group Therapy (1988)	Buzz (1989)

Professional ratings
Review scores
Source	Rating
Allmusic	2/5 stars

Group Therapy is the second studio album by Alter Natives, released on June 20, 1988 by SST Records.

== Track listing ==
All music is composed by Chris Bopst, Greg Ottinger, Jim Thomson and Eric Ungar.

No.	Title	Length
1.	"Bozo Bimbo Baby"	4:18
2.	"Mayo Bridge to Cuba"	5:42
3.	"Neurotic Envoy"	4:33
4.	"Caffiend"	3:46
5.	"Life Thru the Window" (Part 2)	2:45
6.	"Life Thru the Window" (Part 1)	1:28
7.	"Poindexter"	7:32
8.	"Ripe"	4:38
9.	"Ringworm; Wig Wam"	7:24

== Personnel ==
Adapted from the Group Therapy liner notes.

Alter Natives

- Chris Bopst – bass guitar, kazoo, vocals, design
- Greg Ottinger – guitar
- Jim Thomson – drums, congas, tabla, percussion, vocals
- Eric Ungar – saxophone, flute, guitar

Production and design

- Eric Bopst – illustrations
- Richard Ford – mastering
- Adam Green – production, engineering

== Release history ==
Region	Date	Label	Format	Catalog
United States	1988	SST	CD, LP	SST 185
