= Brad Yoder =

Brad Yoder may refer to:

- Brad Yoder (musician), songwriter/performer who resides in Pittsburgh
- Brad Yoder, actor starring in Red Dirt Rising
