= Motherfuckers JMB & Co. =

American psychedelic rock band

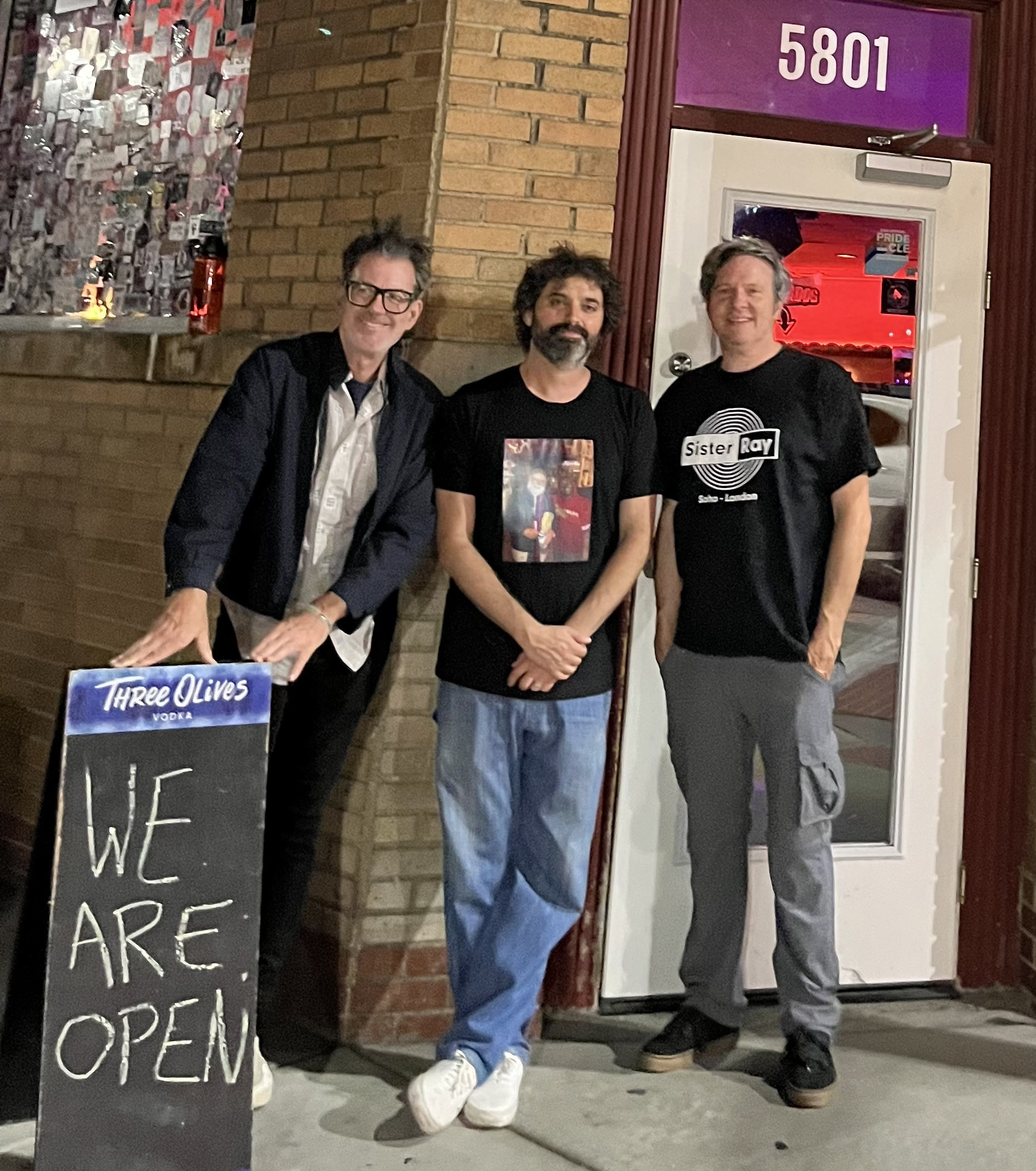
Jim Thomson, Brian Weitz, Marc Minsker

Motherfuckers JMB & Co. are an American instrumental psychedelic rock band from the Washington, D.C. area. The group consists of Brian Weitz of Animal Collective, Jim Thomson, also known as Hans Orifice, formerly of Gwar, and Marc Minsker.

== History ==
The group originated during the COVID-19 pandemic, when Weitz and Minsker began collaborating on improvised music using instruments including hurdy-gurdy and harmonium. Jim Thomson joined the project in October of 2023, and the trio began performing live later that year.

The band has been mentioned in coverage of Weitz's work outside of Animal Collective.

The band's name references the 1972 album Motherfuckers GmbH & Co. by the German krautrock group Xhol Caravan.

In 2025, the group released their debut album, Music Excitement Action Beauty. The band continued to receive coverage in 2026 in connection with Weitz's solo work and Thomson's independent label activities.

== Musical style ==
Critics have described the band's music as psychedelic rock incorporating elements of drone, space rock, motorik, and krautrock.

== Reception ==
Music Excitement Action Beauty was named "Album of the Week" by Stereogum. The album was also included in The Quietus year-end roundup of notable psychedelic rock releases of 2025.

== Discography ==
=== Studio albums ===
- Music Excitement Action Beauty (2025)
