= John Shumway =

American journalist

John Shumway is an American journalist, working at KDKA-TV in Pittsburgh, Pennsylvania.

Shumway began his broadcasting career as a disc jockey for WLAP Radio in Lexington, Kentucky. He earned his Bachelor of Arts degree in Journalism from Eastern Kentucky University in 1978. After graduation, he started his news career in the WLAP Radio newsroom. In 1979, Shumway moved to WHAS Radio News in Louisville, Kentucky, where he switched over to WHAS-TV News as a reporter in 1982.

He joined KDKA-TV in October 1988 as a General Assignment Reporter. At KDKA-TV, he has anchored the morning and weekend news. Previously, he was a featured General Assignment Reporter on the station's evening newscasts. He was also featured on KDKA-AM where he co-hosted the KDKA Morning News with Larry Richert and Shelly Duffy until he left in April 2020. He is now a member of the KDKA-TV Morning News team.

== Awards and recognition ==
Shumway has been the recipient of:

- A Columbia DuPont Citation
- Ohio State Journalism Award
- An Emmy nomination (for local news Emmy awards)

== Personal ==
He resides in the Pittsburgh area with his wife, Sonya, and their two children.
