= Rumba Baby Rumba! =

Studio album by Bio Ritmo
- Released: 1998
- Genre: Rumba, salsa
- Label: Triloka/Mercury
- Producer: Jeffrey Lesser

Bio Ritmo chronology
Salsa Galactica (1997)	Rumba Baby Rumba! (1998)	Bio Ritmo (2004)

Rumba Baby Rumba! is an album by the American band Bio Ritmo, released in 1998. The band supported the album by touring with Squirrel Nut Zippers.

== Production ==
Recorded at Sound of Music, in Richmond, Virginia, the album was produced by Jeffrey Lesser. The music was written and arranged by band leader Rene Herrera in four weeks. The band's record company encouraged them to incorporate more pop elements. "Tequila" is a cover of the Champs' song. "Night Music" is an interpretation of Mozart's Eine kleine Nachtmusik.

== Critical reception ==
Professional ratings
Review scores
Source	Rating
AllMusic	3.5/5 stars
MusicHound World: The Essential Album Guide	3.5/5 stars

Orlando Weekly wrote that, "like the Squirrel Nut Zippers, Bio Ritmo transcends rote revivalism by allowing their natural eccentricities and modern inclinations to strut." Newsday stated: "Tongue well in cheek, Rumba Baby Rumba! is a joy... Bio Ritmo ably combines the energy of swing with the percussive flavor of salsa and son." The Morning Call considered the album "loaded with lively, catchy numbers that sound as if they're coming straight out of Havana."

The Orlando Sentinel thought that "original Herrera compositions such as 'Yo Soy la Rumba' and 'Sientate Ahi' are fine contributions to the Afro-Cuban repertoire." The Pittsburgh Post-Gazette determined that, "despite the Bio Ritmo's largely inauthentic origins, the band seems to have passed the credibility test." The Philadelphia Inquirer opined that "the band's own humor-inflected, bilingual tunes mark the high point of its salsa madness."

AllMusic called the album a "sensual and kinetic collection of contemporary Latin rhythms."

== Track listing ==
No.	Title	Length
1.	"Yo Soy la Rumba"
2.	"Call Me Up (644-7215)"
3.	"Bin Bin"
4.	"What I Want to Say"
5.	"You Killed My Love"
6.	"Tequila"
7.	"Ugly"
8.	"Un Carnaval en la Habana"
9.	"You Rule Over Me"
10.	"Una Palabra"
11.	"Sientate Ahi"
12.	"Night Music"
