= Eric Ungar =

- Genres: Jazz fusion
- Occupation: Musician
- Instruments: Saxophone, flute, guitar
- Years active: 1985–present
- Labels: SST
- Formerly of: Alter Natives

Eric Ungar is an American saxophonist, flautist and guitarist. He is perhaps best recognized as a founding member of the jazz fusion ensemble Alter Natives as well as his contributions to the group Hotel X. Ungar left the Alter Natives after the release of their second album Group Therapy, causing the band to embrace a more progressive rock style.

== Discography ==
Alter Natives

- Hold Your Tongue (SST, 1986)
- Group Therapy (SST, 1988)

Appears on

- Lawndale: Sasquatch Rock (SST, 1987)
- Hotel X: Uncommon Grounds (SST, 1996)
