= Alter Natives =

- Origin: Richmond, Virginia, United States
- Genres: Jazz fusion, punk rock
- Years active: 1984–1991
- Label: SST
- Spinoffs: Gwar
- Past members: Chris Bopst; Greg Ottinger; Jim Thomson; Eric Ungar

Alter Natives were an instrumental band in Richmond, Virginia in the mid 1980s and early 1990s. Formed by Greg Ottinger, Jim Thomson, Chris Bopst, and Eric Ungar in 1984, their work has been described as a combination of "metal/tropical/surf" and as having "connections to progressive and space rock, albeit an unusually concise, powerful, and disciplined version of those genres", and "hard and fast instrumental fare geared tunefully by a mean, acidic guitar interplay and essential upfront rhythms". The band signed to SST Records in 1986 and released three albums through the label. Though only four albums were released, material from a fifth unreleased album is available in rough form on the band's MySpace page.

== Members ==
- Chris Bopst – bass guitar
- Greg Ottinger – guitar
- Jim Thomson – drums
- Eric Ungar – saxophone and flute (1985–1988)

== Discography ==
- 1985: Friends of The Farm (Self published cassette)
- 1986: Hold Your Tongue
- 1988: Group Therapy
- 1989: Buzz
