= Ransom Seaborn =

2006 novel by Bill Deasy

- First edition
- Author: Bill Deasy
- Publisher: Velluminous Press
- Publication date: 2006
- Pages: 214
- ISBN: 1482543281
- Followed by: Traveling Clothes

Ransom Seaborn is the debut novel by singer-songwriter and recording artist Bill Deasy. The novel was published by Velluminous Press in 2006.

== Reception ==
The Pittsburgh City Paper said while the characters in Ransom Seaborn were likable, the newspaper felt that Deasy added too many details in the book.
