= Dallas Wayne =

American singer-songwriter (born 1956)

Dallas Wayne (born 1956) is a singer, songwriter, voice-over artist and for SiriusXM Satellite Radio personality. A native of Springfield, Missouri, he grew up in Branson and Cape Girardeau, Missouri. Dallas began performing professionally while in high school.

In 1975 he moved to Nashville where he further developed his vocal style singing demos for many of the top music publishing houses. He roomed with Dennis Morgan.

While touring Europe in the early '90s, Dallas signed a one-album deal with Finland's Texicalli Records. He went on to record six albums. Later, he moved to Scandinavia, where he became a staff writer for Warner/Chappell Music.

After four years living and touring in Europe, Dallas returned to the U.S. and signed a record deal with HighTone Records. In addition to recording two albums of his own on the HighTone label, Dallas was a part of the honky-tonk supergroup the TwangBangers.

Dallas moved to Austin in 2003; two years later, he released the album I'm Your Biggest Fan on the Koch Records Nashville label. In 2009, Smith Entertainment released his album I'll Take the Fifth. Dallas performed with the legendary country band Heybale 2011-20 every Sunday night at The Continental Club in Austin.

In 2016 and 2018, respectively, Dallas recorded the albums Songs the Jukebox Taught Me and Songs the Jukebox Taught Me Volume 2, which Heart of Texas released. On these albums Dallas paid tribute to his classic country music heroes and teachers in a fresh collection of standards featuring some well-known special guests, including Willie Nelson and Jeannie Seely.

Seely and Nelson recorded a song Dallas wrote called "Not a Dry Eye in the House," which was released as a radio single on Curb Records in 2021.

Dallas' latest album is 2022's "Coldwater, Tennessee" released by BFD/Audium Nashville and distributed exclusively through The Orchard.

Dallas currently resides in Bristol, TN, where he pursues his radio career, songwriting, and touring.

== Radio shows ==
Dallas Wayne can be heard on Sirius XM Satellite Radio, Monday through Friday from noon to 6 p.m. Eastern at Willie's Roadhouse (channel 61), Tuesday through Friday in Outlaw Country (channel 62) from 10 a.m. to noon Eastern, and on Sunday from 10 a.m. to noon Eastern at Willie's Roadhouse.

== Awards ==
The Academy of Western Artists presented Dallas with a Will Rogers Award for Classic Country Major Market DJ of the Year in 2006 for his work at KHYI 95.3 FM in Dallas, Texas. He received a second Will Rogers Award in 2009 for DJ of the Year, this time in recognition of his work at Sirius XM Satellite Radio.

The Ameripolitan Music Awards named Dallas the DJ of the year in 2014. The same year, Dallas received the Ameripolitan Honky Tonk Group of the year award as part of the band Heybale!

Dallas was inducted into the Texas Country Music Hall of Fame's Disc Jockey Hall of Fame in 2015.

In 2018, Dallas was awarded the CMA of Texas Choice Award (formerly CMA of Texas Hall of Fame).

Dallas and Heybale! were named the Academy of Western Artists’ Pure Country Group of the Year in 2020.

Nashville's Reunion of Professional Entertainers (R.O.P.E.) named Dallas the Country Disc Jockey of the Year in 2023.

== Performance credits ==
Dallas' theater, TV and movie appearances include multiple performances on The Grand Ole Opry, Larry's Country Diner, TruCountry and the Country's Family Reunion Tribute to Merle Haggard. His acting credits include the national touring company of Harry Chapin's Cotton Patch Gospel; "Stanley Sanders" in the critically acclaimed musical Smoke on the Mountain; "Eddie" with the original Broadway cast of Pump Boys and Dinettes; and a movie narration in the award-winning satirical documentary The Joy Boys Story.

== Discography ==
Album	Year	Label
Coldwater, Tennessee	2022	BFD/Audium Nashville
Songs the Jukebox Taught Me Vol. 2	2018	Heart of Texas Records
Heybale "Play Me A Cheatin' Song"	2017	Heybale! Records
Songs the Jukebox Taught Me	2016	Heart of Texas Records
I'll Take the Fifth	2009	Smith Entertainment
I'm Your Biggest Fan	2005	Koch Records Nashville
Touch My Heart: A Tribute to Johnny Paycheck	2004	Sugar Hill Records
Chowdogs: Not the Same	2004	Blue Mill Productions
TwangBangers Live	2002	HighTone Records
Here I Am in Dallas	2001	HighTone Records
Big Thinkin'	2006	HighTone Records
Invisible Man	1999	Texicalli
Screamin' Down the Highway	1997	Bluelight Records
Part of the Crew	1994	Texicalli
Buckle Up Baby	1993	Amigo Records
Lucky 13	1992	Amigo Records
Special Consensus: Hey Y'all	1990	Turquoise Records
Georgia Dreamin'	1990	Grand Avenue Records
