= Kukuruza =

Russian band

- Origin: Moscow, Russia
- Genres: Bluegrass, country, country-rock, country folk, Russian folk
- Years active: 1984–present
- Labels: Greener Pastures; Sugar Hill Records; Gadfly Records
- Members: Lineup beginning c. 1998/2000: Svetlana Shebeko; (lead vocals): Pavel Titovetes; (electric guitar): Sergei Novikov; (violin): Roman Mayboroda; (bass guitar): Dmitry Krichevsky; (drums): Georgi Palmov; (harmonica, mandolin, acoustic guitar, vocals)
- Past members: Lineup 1993: Irina Surina; (lead vocals): Alexei Aboltynsh; (acoustic bass, electric bass, vocals): Anatoliy Belchikov; (drums): Sergei Mosolov; (fiddle, vocals): Andrei Shepelev; (banjo, dobro, steel guitar, acoustic guitar, vocals, composer): Georgi Palmov; (mandolin, clarinet, vocals): Dmitry Vakhrameev; (banjo): Mikhail Venikov; (guitar, electric guitar): Additions from 1998 album Endless Story; Ilya Toshinsky; (banjo): Roman Zaslavsky; (piano)
- Website: www.kukuruza.info/english.shtml

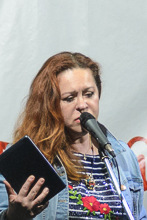
Irina Surina (June 2017), lead singer for Kukuruza, 1989–2000

Kukuruza is a Russian band who progressed from a student startup to become an international touring act in the early 1990s.

In 1994, the Chicago Tribune said they were "among the top country groups of Eastern Europe and Russia". That same year, they performed their bluegrass-influenced music before the genre's founder, Bill Monroe, at the Grand Ole Opry in Nashville, Tennessee. As of 2013, they were the only Eastern European group to play at the Opry.

Their repertoire includes a mix of music, from Russian folk to American bluegrass, to country-rock, rock-and-roll and blues. The band toured the United States six times from 1991 to 1994. They have performed country and bluegrass-influenced music longer than any other Russian group, with a total of 15 albums over 30 years, 3 in the United States and 12 more in Russia. The band is still active, but with a different lineup of performers than they had in the mid-1980s and 1990s when they rose to international prominence. In 2010 they played at the Montreux Jazz Festival.

The band's name КукурузА is the Russian word for corn. Years after the founding, the story of taking the name has been lost, as different members remember different things. The name wasn't meant to imply corny or funny, however. It was a serious name that implied that the band had many flavors, just as corn has many flavors, depending upon where it is grown.

== Beginnings ==
The band began as a student "collective". In 1975, students Sergei Senchilo (acoustic guitar) and Czech student Vladimir Ambros (harmonica) got together to play songs of United States, England, and Scotland. By the next year, they had attracted others, and were calling the group Ornament. Ornament lasted until about 1983. Beginning in 1984, some of its members continued to play together under the new name Kukuruza.

They began their interest in western music before the end of the Cold War. Their early adaptation of western music in the years before perestroika was difficult and dangerous, because western music was suspect (possibly illegal) in the Soviet Union. Facing bans for playing "music of the ideological enemy," they pursued their musical interests in the mid-1980s, attending music festivals and recording their first album, We Sing in English, which was not one of their bluegrass albums.

The Soviet Union gradually loosened official resistance to western music and some western bands were able to tour. After seeing performances by Roy Clark (who visited Russia in 1976 and 1988) and the Nitty Gritty Dirt Band (who toured Russia in 1977), the students who would become Ornament and Kukuruza looked for music that they could access to learn from. They learned the bluegrass style by listening to Czech bands, and to American performances through banned Voice of America shortwave radio broadcasts and black-market second-hand records.

Bluegrass has specific instruments, some of which were rare in Russia. Others were present, but not played in the bluegrass style there. They chose western instruments and taught themselves to use them, dobro, banjo, mandolin, fiddle and guitar, as well as electric guitar. Not being in the United States, they didn't have the bluegrass community's artistic pressure to conform to use only acoustic instruments. They adapted electric guitar into their mix, perhaps led by the Nitty Gritty Dirt Band, whom they had seen in concert, who also used electric guitar in some of their music. Learning the style on their own, they successfully blended it with Russian music. They began a process of fusing east and west. Songs such as John Hartford's 1971 progressive bluegrass "Vamp in the Middle" were translated and adapted, using bluegrass instruments to create the sound but blending with Russian vocals. Similarly they applied western instruments (electric guitar, banjo, mandolin, fiddle) to a Russian jazz work, Leonid Utesov's "The Old Cabby's Song". Russian folk songs were adapted too, and one of the band, Andrei Shepelev, proved to be a songwriter as well. He was credited as writing or adapting many of their pieces on the albums made in the United States.

When the 1998 record, Endless Journey was released, the president at Gadfly Records, Mitch Cantor, commented on the group's style. He said that he didn't think of them as a bluegrass band, but a group with a "unique juxtaposition of styles," able to switch between Russian traditional, jazz and bluegrass styles of music, yet still maintain their own sound.

== United States tours ==
The band made tours to the United States in the early 1990s. During the release of their second record made in the United States, Crossing Borders, they performed at the Grand Ole Opry, and were on the television show Nashville Now.

They were given the opportunities to work with county music performers Emmylou Harris, Doc Watson and Jerry Douglas, the latter of whom performed on their Crossing Borders album.

== Lineup ==
1975, pre-Ornament
Sergei Senchilo (acoustic guitar)
Vladimir Ambros (harmonica), Czechoslovakia

Ornament (1976–1983)

The members of the group had graduated from undergraduate studies by 1981. In 1983 the group ended.

Sergei Senchilo – bandleader, vocals, acoustic guitar (1975– )
Dmitry Sukhin – piano
Vladimir Galperin – violin (1976)
Sergei Bondarenko – acoustic guitar (1976–1978)
Vladimir Ambros – violin, banjo, mandolin, lip accordion, Czechoslovakia (1976–1980)
Eva Kovacs – vocals, less than one year, Hungary
Georgy Palmov (beginning fall 1976) – clarinet and block-flute, mandolin, guitar, lip-organ
Andrey Shepelev – 5-string banjo (1978–1994)
Rostislav Prisekin – bass guitar (1979–1980)
Dmitry Sukhin – sound engineering, (1980– )
Larisa (Nuzhdova) Grigorieva – vocalist (c.1980–c.1989)
Karel Wahh Ukrainian guitar, Czechoslovakia (c.1980– )

Kukuruza 1984/1985
Larisa (Nuzhdova) Grigorieva – lead vocals
Andrei Shepelev – banjo
Vladimir Larshin – violin
Rostislav Prisekin – acoustic guitar, harmonica
Alexander Tarev – double bass
Bari Alibasov
Georgy Palmov
Sergei Mosolov – double bass

== Parallel projects by former Kukuruza members ==
=== Red Grass ===
Larisa Grigorieva, lead singer for Kukuruza from 1980 to 1989, performed on the albums Let's sing in English and The Magician. After leaving Kukuruza in 1989, she founded the band Red Grass (1990–1995). The band created one album, Рыжая трава (Red-Backed Grass), in 1995.

Although Russian country music suffered a decline in the late 1980s after the closing of the "фестиваля кантри и фолк музыки 'Фермер'" ("Farmer" festival of country and folk music), Grigorieva was still involved in Russian country music in 2018, managing the Moscow Country Bridge Festival. Her album contributed to the name "Red Grass" to refer to Russian country music. That name was also used as an album title by former Bering Strait performer Ilya Toshinsky and had been suggested in the United States in 1994 as an apt name for pre-perestroika Russian-bluegrass music.

== Discography ==
=== United States ===
- 1992 — Kukuruza — A Russian Country Bluegrass Band, Greener Pastures Records Inc.
- 1993 — Crossing Borders, Sugar Hill Records
- 1998 — Endless Story, Gadfly Records

=== Russia ===
- 1986 — Давайте петь по-английски, Мелодия (Let's sing in English, Melody)
- 1988 — Фокусник, Мелодия (The Magician, Melody)
- 1993 — Там, где солнечный свет, Solid Records (Where the sunshine)
- 1996 — Бесконечная история, LO Production (Endless Story)
- 1996 — Чудак, Птичий рынок и Фокусник, RDM Co.Ltd. (Freak, Bird Market and Magician)
- 1997 — Ой, мороз, мороз, Moroz Records (Ouch, frost, frost)
- 1997 — Кукуруза, Пересечение Границ (Corn, Crossing the Borders)
- 1997 — В Кругу Друзей, Moroz Video Studio (In the Circle of Friends)
- 1999 — Музыкальный Ринг, 1986 г., ТВ-Нева (The Musical Ring, 1986, TV-Neva)
- 2006 — Антология, 1986–2006, Альфа Рекордз (Anthology, 1986–2006, Alfa Records)
- 2010 — Принуждение к Радости, TП Production (Forced To Joy, TP Production)
- 2012 — КукурузА — 25 лет (Kukuruza for 25 years)
