= John Yoder =

John Yoder may refer to:

- John Howard Yoder, American theologian and ethicist
- John C. Yoder, American lawyer, judge and politician in West Virginia
