= The Kalob Griffin Band =

- Origin: Philadelphia, Pennsylvania, United States
- Genres: Americana; Alternative country Indie folk Folk; Bluegrass
- Years active: 2009–present
- Members: Kalob Griffin; Rob Dwyer; Eric Lawry; John Hildenbrand
- Website: www.kalobgriffinband.com

The Kalob Griffin Band (The KGB) is a Philadelphia-based five-piece Americana rock band formed in 2009 and is most commonly known for their impromptu shows and the allegiance of their community-driven fanbase.

== History ==
The Kalob Griffin Band began when frontman Kalob Griffin met current lead guitarist/mandolin/banjoist Rob Dwyer at a house party, the two attended at Pennsylvania State University in 2009. The two linked up with other college friends, and went on to perform at packed venues in State College, Pennsylvania. Griffin and Dwyer continued a full-time career as musicians post-college, and after many band transformations, the "KGB" secured its lineup in 2011. The current folk-rock quintet includes Eric Lawry on drums and backup vocals, John Hildenbrand on keys and backup vocals, and Jonathan Colvson on electric bass.

The band started with several local shows, including a live session on a classic rock show on Penn State’s student-run radio station, WKPS. The band landed a weekly gig at State College’s Café 210 West, opened for Matt Pond PA, embarked on two national tours as the supporting band for emerging British singer/songwriter Bobby Long (ATO Records), and released a self-titled EP. The band has been touring as their own outfit since 2012.

== Musical career ==
They released their first full-length album, "June Found a Gun" in 2012, which was followed by a tour. They have released tracks from their forthcoming EP, "Full Love," mixed by Bill Morarity (Dr. Dog, Man Man) and mastered by Greg Calbi (Alabama Shakes, Bruce Springsteen) of Sterling Sound.

The Kalob Griffin Band has played to crowds of thousands, including at the WXPN Music Festival in Philadelphia, Pennsylvania and the Mile High Music Festival in Denver, Colorado. The band has had national radio airplay, playing over 150 shows, including major festival appearances and gigs along the east coast. The lyrical style is similar to that of the generational narratives of Neil Young and Bruce Springsteen. The Kalob Griffin Band has been compared to contemporary artists such as Deer Tick (band) and Whiskeytown. The band has had profile features in The Herald-Sun and Fly Magazine.

Festival appearances include the WXPN Music Festival, Mile High Music Festival, Musikfest, Susquehanna Breakdown and the Dewey Beach, Delaware Music Conference.

In 2011, the Kalob Griffin Band was nominated for The Deli magazine's Philadelphia Emerging Acts of 2011 and the WSTW Best EP Homey Award and Best Song Homey Award. Within the first couple of months of 2012, they were awarded the Tri-State Indie Best Philadelphia Artist Award.

Often during shows, fans are heard chanting "KGB, KGB", a mantra attached to the "KGB Family".

== Members ==
- Kalob Griffin – lead vocals, guitar
- Eric Lawry – drums, vocals
- Rob Dwyer – lead guitar, mandolin, banjo
- Jonathan Colvosn – upright and electric bass
- John Hildenbrand – keys, backup vocals

== Discography ==
=== EPs ===
- Kalob Griffin Band (2011)
- "Full Love" (2014)

=== Albums ===
- "June Found a Gun" (2012)
