= Bill Deasy =

American singer-songwriter

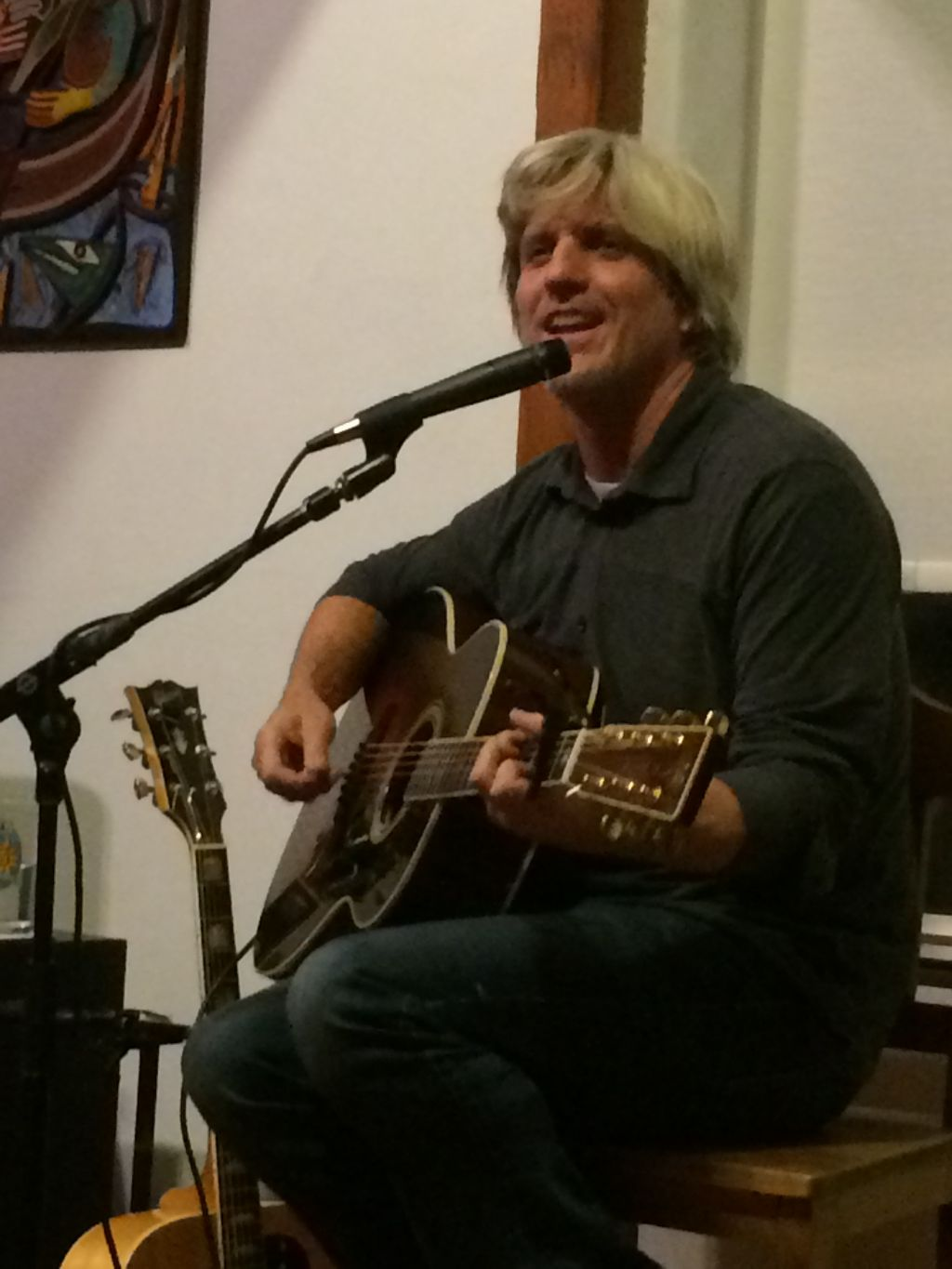
- Deasy performing at a house concert. Pittsburgh, PA. November 4, 2017

Background information
- Born: Bill Deasy; Pittsburgh, Pennsylvania; United States
- Origin: Pittsburgh, Pennsylvania
- Genres: Pop rock Folk rock
- Occupation: Singer-songwriter
- Years active: 1994–present
- Website: Bill Deasy

Bill Deasy is a singer-songwriter, recording artist and author born and raised in Pittsburgh, Pennsylvania. In the late 1980s, Deasy's musical start blossomed at open stages in and around Pittsburgh. Within a few years Deasy and his band, Shiloh, outscored Rusted Root to win the 1991 Graffiti Rock Challenge, a local Pittsburgh competition. By the mid-90s, with Shiloh defunct, a new group emerged and Deasy became the lead singer-songwriter of The Gathering Field, whose regional hit "Lost in America", from an album by the same name, led to a deal with Atlantic Records in 1996. After parting ways with Atlantic, The Gathering Field released three more albums: Reliance, the self-titled The Gathering Field and So Close To Home. During that time Deasy also released a semi-acoustic solo album, Spring Lies Waiting. The Gathering Field did not record for several years during which time Deasy continued to record and perform as mostly a solo act. In 2014, The Gathering Field reunited for their release Wild Journey and in 2017 Deasy and Gathering Field band-mate Dave Brown released Glory Bound.

== Career ==
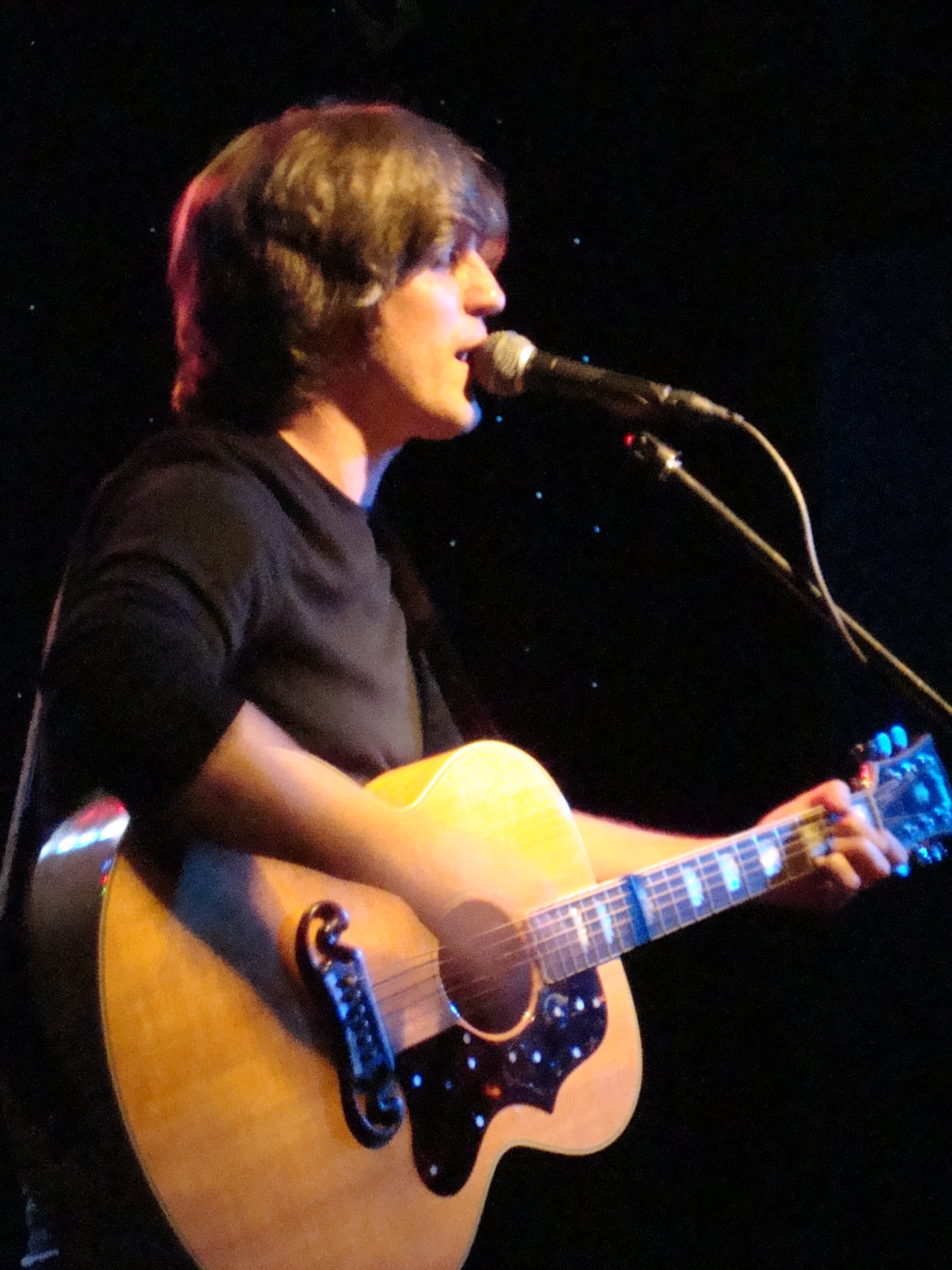
Performing at his annual Boxing Day performance at the Club Cafe. Pittsburgh, PA. December 26, 2008

Spring Lies Waiting was Deasy's first solo effort, made while The Gathering Field was still together and produced by the band's lead guitarist and producer, Dave Brown.
Good Day No Rain followed as Deasy's first official release as a solo artist on his own Bound To Be Records label. Four of the songs on the CD were produced by Gregg Wattenberg and the balance co-produced by Deasy and Dave McNair.
Chasing Down a Spark was the follow-up to the 2003 release Good Day No Rain. The CD was produced by Kevin Salem and mixed by Joe Blaney. The majority of the new CD was recorded in Woodstock and New York City and features guitar work from The Clarks’ Rob James and producer Kevin Salem. Two members of Deasy's Pittsburgh-based band, Scott Tamulinas and Dave Throckmorton provide bass and drums, respectively. Other session players were Rob Arthur on keyboards, Oli Kraus on cello and David Mansfield on pedal steel and violin. The CD also features guest appearances by Donnie Iris, The Clarks’ Scott Blasey, Rachael Yamagata and Maia Sharp.
The Miles was Deasy's first self-produced recording, released in July 2007. Recorded in Pittsburgh, it features members of the Bill Deasy band and a guest appearance by Los Angeles singer-songwriter Renee Stahl.
Drain Tapes, Volume 1 is a 7-song EP containing acoustic demos of songs not previously recorded. Songs include "Better Than Never at All," "Somebody Else’s Town" and "The Light I See."
In 2003 Deasy wrote "Learning to Fall" with Odie Blackmon, that was recorded by Martina McBride for her album Martina.
In September 2007 Deasy wrote and performed the promotional piece "Your Home" for Pittsburgh TV Station, KDKA.
In November 2008 Deasy released A Different Kind of Wild, a collection of "heartfelt and earnest" songs that include him playing keyboards for the first time. The collection of ten songs is another "thoughtful and intimate" record on which Deasy penned nine of the ten songs without collaboration.

One year later, Deasy released his sixth full-length solo CD Being Normal. One review of the CD states: "The full-band instrumentation on Being Normal is flavorful without being overbearing."

In 2013 Deasy released Start Again, a record that he says is a reflection of the musicians who first inspired him such as Van Morrison, Neil Young, Bob Dylan and Jackson Browne. Produced by Chris Parker, the album includes songs co-written with Odie Blackmon and Kim Richey. Once again Maia Sharp is a guest vocalist.

"Lost in America"
Deasy performing the title track from his debut recording with The Gathering Field.

== Collaborations ==
Although Deasy pens the majority of his own material by himself, some collaborations do appear on the full-length CDs cited in this discography and the Gathering Field's Reliance album. Among the co-writers represented are Odie Blackmon, Paul Brady, Molly Bancroft and Teitur. However, Deasy collaborates more frequently when he is writing for artists other than himself. Some of these songs have appeared on albums by Martina McBride, Kim Richey, The Clarks, Bijou Phillips, Howard Jones, Billy Ray Cyrus and Michael Stanley. He has written with songwriters such as Mark Hudson, Darrell Brown, Richie Supa, Stephen Bishop, Maia Sharp, Kim Richey, Jane Wiedlin and Jamie Houston.

In 2001, during a trip to Nashville, Deasy and Larry Gottlieb wrote a song called "Good Things are Happening". A demo of the song was submitted to the television show Good Morning America and was selected to appear as part of a promotional campaign. The 10-week campaign was extended for four years and the song became known as the Good Morning America theme song.

In early 2007 Deasy joined creative forces with Rick Jacques, formerly a guitarist in the Pittsburgh band Brownie Mary. Within a few months Deasy and Jacques had co-written a handful of songs. Continuing their collaboration, the result was a "shimmering studio product" titled The Invisible Ocean released in early 2008. The duo chose to release the CD under the name Thomas Jefferson's Aeroplane which, Deasy says, was sparked by a discussion about the book The Disappearance of the Universe which stated that Thomas Jefferson had his own version of the bible.

== Published works ==
Deasy's debut novel, Ransom Seaborn, was published to in August 2006 by Velluminous Press. The novel was the recipient of the 2006 Needle Award. One reviewer said, "There's no shortage of coming-of-age novels, so any addition to the genre best have something unique about it. Bill Deasy's debut, Ransom Seaborn, has an original premise, one amazingly eccentric character and some solid writing to recommend."

Velluminous published Deasy's second novel, Traveling Clothes, in October 2009. The third novel in the trilogy – Ghost Tree – was published in 2010.

== Interesting facts ==
– The song "Levi" was inspired by getting his hair washed before a haircut in New York City. The salon was located on the second floor, hence the beginning line: "I was baptized by Levi in a second floor sink". He finished composing the bulk of the song on a subway back downtown.

– Deasy tours across the country as a headlining act but has also opened up for artists such as Bruce Springsteen, Bob Dylan, Rosanne Cash, Patty Griffin, John Hiatt, World Party, Norah Jones and the late Warren Zevon.

== Discography ==
2023	Live at Club Cafe	Slightly Aimless Records
2022	If the Creek Don't Rise	Slightly Aimless Records
2018	Swingers, Scamps & Stallions	Slightly Aimless Records
2017	Glory Bound (with Dave Brown)	Mudpuppy Records
2016	Timeless Things	Slightly Aimless Records
2014	Wild Journey (Gathering Field)	Mudpuppy Records
2013	Start Again	Slightly Aimless Records
2011	Gathering Field Live (Gathering Field)	Mudpuppy Records
2010	Express (Thomas Jefferson's Aeroplane)	Cousteau Records
2009	Being Normal	Slightly Aimless Records
2008	A Different Kind of Wild	Slightly Aimless Records
2008	The Invisible Ocean (Thomas Jefferson's Aeroplane)	Cousteau Records
2007	The Miles	Slightly Aimless Records
2005	Chasing Down a Spark	Bound to Be Records
2004	Drain Tapes, Vol 1	Bound to Be Records
2003	Good Day No Rain	Bound to Be Records
2001	So Close to Home (Gathering Field)	Mudpuppy
2000	Spring Lies Waiting	Onoma Records
1999	Reliance (Gathering Field)	Onoma Records
1996	Lost in America (Gathering Field)	Atlantic Records
1994	The Gathering Field (Gathering Field)	Mudpuppy Record
