= Rusty Shackle =

Welsh folk rock band

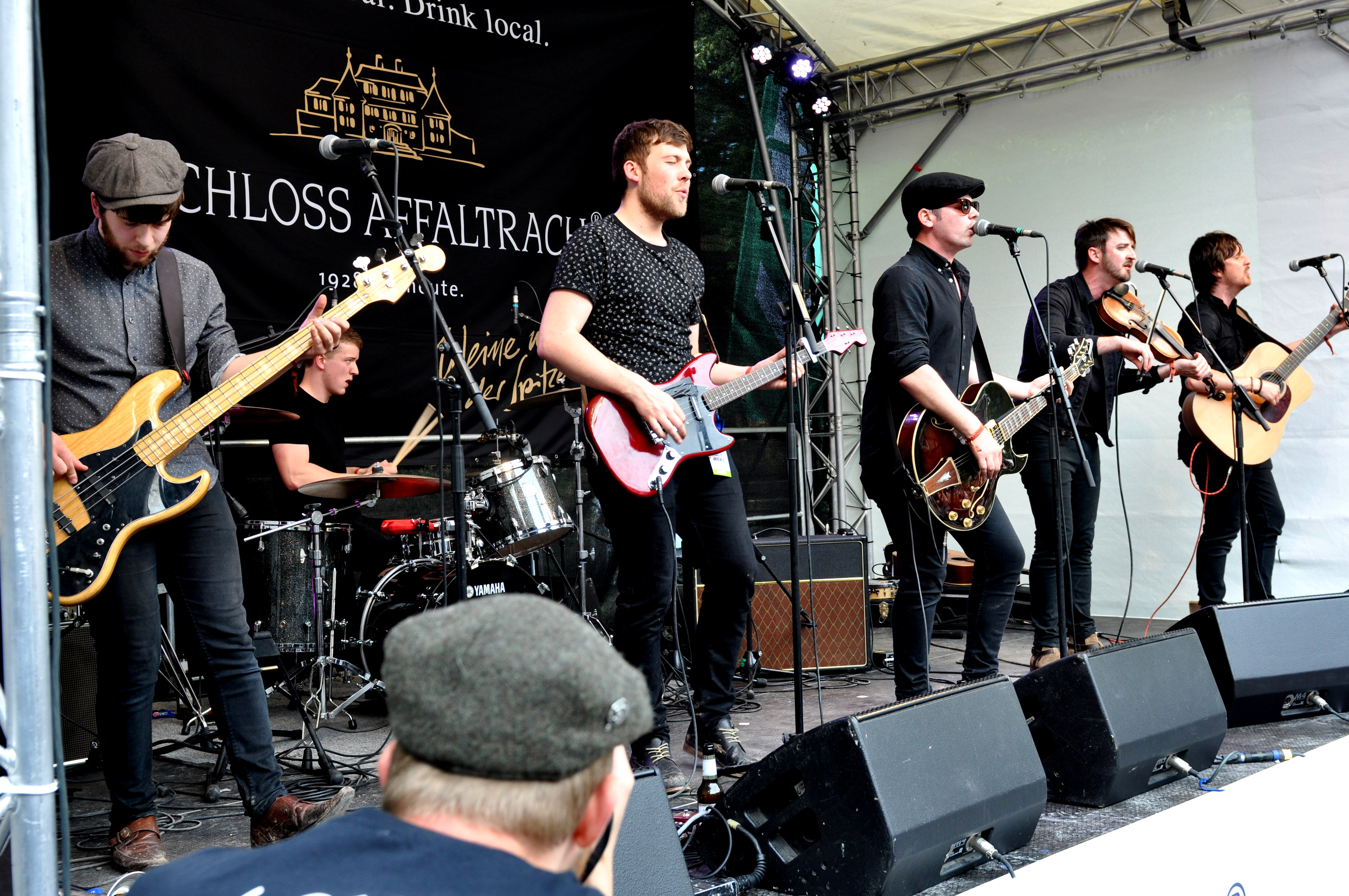
- Rusty Shackle at the 2016 Blacksheep Festival in Germany

Background information
- Origin: Caldicot, Wales
- Genre: Folk rock
- Years active: 2010–present
- Members: Mathew Barwick; Liam Collins; George Barrell; Alex McConnachie; Scott McKeon; Ryan Williams
- Past members: Owen Emmanuel; James McKeon
- Website: rustyshackle.com

Rusty Shackle are a Welsh, Monmouthshire based folk rock band, formed in Caldicot in early 2010. They are a six-piece group made up of band members Liam Collins (main vocals, guitar), Mathew Barwick (tenor guitar, mandola, vocals), George Barrell (drums, vocals), Ryan Williams (Bass, trumpet, piano), Scott McKeon (fiddle, banjo, vocals), and Alex McConnachie (acoustic guitar, synth). Combining guitars, fiddle, banjo, bass, mandola, trumpet and percussion, Rusty Shackle are influenced by bluegrass, folk, rock, Celtic and old time blues.

Their first EP, the four track Hounds of Justice, reached number 2 in the iTunes Singer Songwriter chart, and tracks from the EP also made BBC Radio Wales' main playlist. Rusty Shackle released their debut album, Wash Away These Nights, in 2011. In 2012, the self-proclaimed 'dirty bluegrass folk 'n rollers' beat other acts to win the 'Cardiff's Big Gig' competition, which saw them gain a performing slot at the 2012 Olympic Torch Relay Concert in Cooper's Field, Cardiff. This gig saw them play alongside Kids in Glass Houses, You Me at Six and Emile Sande.

During 2013, the band played at more than twenty festivals all over the UK, including the Cambridge Folk Festival. They also released their second studio album, The Bones, which was recorded at Monnow Valley Studio. The album made it to number 13 in the iTunes Singer Songwriter chart.
