= Simple Gifts (band) =

American musical group

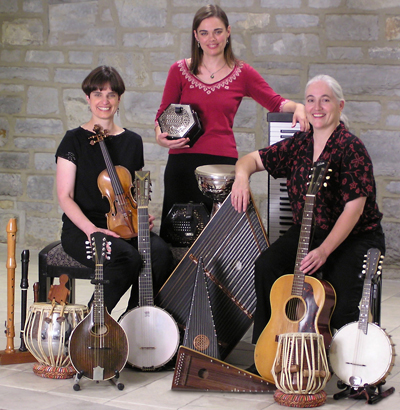
- Simple Gifts and their medley of instruments

Background information
- Origin: Pennsylvania, United States
- Genres: Folk
- Years active: 1989-present
- Labels: Purple Finch Productions
- Members: Linda Littleton, Karen Hirshon
- Website: http://www.simplegiftsmusic.com/

Simple Gifts is a folk trio from Central Pennsylvania founded in 1989. Since 1995, it has consisted of Linda Littleton (fiddle, hammered dulcimer, bowed psaltery, recorders, percussion), Karen Hirshon (vocals, fiddle, baritone fiddle, guitar, mandolin, banjo, banjolin, banjo guitar, spoons, percussion), and Rachel Hall (English concertina, keyboards, percussion). The band plays primarily traditional instrumental tunes from Appalachia; Israel and other Middle Eastern countries; and many European countries, including Ireland, Scotland, Romania, Finland, and Sweden.

== Biography ==
Founding member Linda Littleton began classical violin at age seven. Over the years she has studied with Joanne Zagst Feldman, Ray Montoni, and Geoffrey Michaels, and performed as Principal Second Violin with the Nittany Valley Symphony. She majored in philosophy at Princeton University, with a minor in music and a specialty in the philosophy of music. While at Princeton she studied music theory and composition with professors Paul Lansky, Claudio Spies, J.K. Randall, and others.

Karen Hirshon grew up singing hymns. She began violin lessons when she was 10 years old and took up folk guitar in her early teens. She attended Grinnell College in Iowa, where she designed an independent study program, “Traditional Music in American Culture,” within the discipline of American studies. Her research delved into the anthropological and historical aspects of traditional music, which supplied some of the inspiration for her work today. Karen cites ragtime, jazz, blues, gospel, classical music, African drumming, and American string bands among her influences. During the 1970s, Karen toured nationally with the bluegrass band, Whetstone Run, and then hooked up with the Rustical Quality String Band, which released a self-titled album in 1983. Rustical Quality continues to play at festivals and other events.

Rachel Hall grew up in a musical family in Cincinnati. She began piano lessons at age 6 and, inspired by her father, took up the concertina later in life. She played in a contradance band when she was a teenager. After graduating from Haverford College, where Rachel majored in classical studies, she was awarded a Watson Fellowship to study and collect traditional music in Scandinavia and the British Isles. As part of that grant, she spent six months in the Shetland Islands and three months in Norway and visited Ireland and Scotland. Before joining Simple Gifts in 1995, Rachel was a member of the folk-rock band Broadside Electric and appears with them on the album, With Teeth.

== Awards ==
As part of the 2008 Women's History Month events, the Pennsylvania Commission for Women honored Simple Gifts for their contribution to the arts.

In 2005, the trio won one of the best songs of the year awards from the Indie Acoustic Project for “My Horses Ain’t Hungry,” on the Crossing Borders cd which featured Karen Hirshon on vocals .

The CD, Time and Again, won a bronze award (third place) in the Acoustic Instrumental category from Crossroads Music Awards.

== Discography ==
All titles on Purple Finch Productions.

- Down by the Sally Gardens (1992)
- A Place Just Right (1994)
- Other Places, Other Times (1996)
- Time and Again (1999)
- Crossing Borders: Music of Many Lands (2005)
