= Yoder, British Columbia =

Canadian ghost town

Yoder is a Canadian ghost town in the West Kootenay region of southern British Columbia. The location, on BC Highway 3, is by road about 9 kilometres (6 mi) west of Salmo and 31 kilometres (19 mi) southeast of Castlegar.

== History ==
Yoder is identified with respect to Meadows and Salmo. Meadows was 9.0 kilometres (5.6 mi) west of Salmo, placing it around the Archibald Rd. intersection or 2.0 kilometres (1.2 mi) east of Meadows Junction where BC Highway 3 and BC Highway 3B join. By 1956, the siding at that location was named Archibald. Yoder was 8.9 kilometres (5.5 mi) west of Salmo and 201 metres (220 yd) from Meadows, placing it the latter distance east of Archibald Rd.

The Meadows train station on the Nelson and Fort Sheppard Railway was open from 1893 to 1897. The reopening prior to 1922 would have indicated increasing economic activity in the area.

By 1923, Abner C. Yoder had risen to become district manager of Canadian logging operations for Lindsley Bros. Co. of Spokane. Yoder was the name of the camp. George C. Massey was the only postmaster, serving from September 1923 to October 1924. Only one example of the postal cancellation is known to exist, which last sold for $750. The location neither appeared on maps nor experienced any births, deaths, or marriages. Logs were likely shipped from the Meadows siding. At some point A.C. Yoder Cedar Co. assumed the logging business. After a 1926 fire destroyed the camp, the company switched from inhouse logging operations to employing contractors. In 1936, A.C. Yoder relocated to Spokane. The next year was the final listing of the location in BC directories.

== See also ==
- "1899 Kootenay map". www.library.ubc.ca. p. 1. for Meadow.
