= Ernie Hawkins =

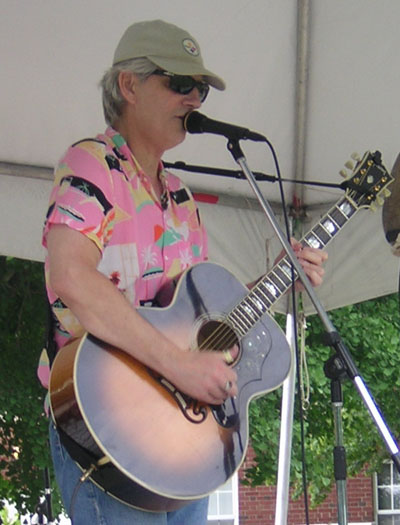
- Ernie Hawkins performing on July 12, 2008

Background information
- Born: Ernest Leroy Hawkins; 1947 (age 78–79); Pittsburgh, Pennsylvania, United States
- Genres: Blues
- Occupations: Musician, guitarist, singer
- Instruments: Guitar, vocals
- Years active: 1965–present
- Labels: Orchard, Say Mo'
- Website: http://www.erniehawkins.com/

Ernie Hawkins (born Ernest Leroy Hawkins, 1947, Pittsburgh, Pennsylvania) is an American acoustic blues guitar player, singer, songwriter, recording artist, and educator.

Hawkins, along with fellow bluesmen Stefan Grossman and Roy Book Binder, studied with blues legend Reverend Gary Davis in New York City in 1965 and 1966. Over the years, he learned a variety of styles, including Piedmont blues, Delta blues, ragtime, and gospel.

In 1969, Hawkins moved back to his hometown of Pittsburgh, and enrolled at the University of Pittsburgh, earning a degree in philosophy. In 1973, he moved to Dallas for graduate school and earned a PhD in phenomenological psychology at the University of Dallas, though he remained active in music, studying and performing with Mance Lipscomb, Robert Pete Williams, Fred McDowell, and Robert "Nyles" Jones.

In 1978, Hawkins decided to put aside his psychology career and become a full-time musician. In the mid 1980s, he returned to Pittsburgh, and for the next ten years played lead guitar with the local R&B act Gary Belloma and the Blue Bombers. Over the years, he played with blues musicians Reverend Gary Davis, Son House, Mance Lipscomb, Fred McDowell, Jim Brewer and others, and has been featured in Sing Out!, Fingerstyle Guitar, Dirty Linen, Acoustic Guitar, Blues Revue and Vintage Guitar magazines. He has appeared on A Prairie Home Companion, Mountain Stage, WoodSongs Old-Time Radio Hour and XM Satellite Radio.

Hawkins appeared on Maria Muldaur's Grammy and Blues Music Award nominated album Richland Woman Blues (2001), and was the guitarist for the national support tour. He lives in Pittsburgh, and continues to perform nationally and internationally and to record, teach, and advocate for blues music.

== Discography ==
- Ragtime Signatures, 1980
- Blues Advice Orchard, 1996
- Bluesified Say Mo', 2000
- Mean Little Poodle Say Mo', 2002
- Rags and Bones Say Mo', 2005
- Whinin' Boy Corona Records, 2010
- Monongahela Rye Corona Records, 2014

== Awards ==
Independent Music Awards 2012: "Shuffle Rag" – Best Cover Song
