= Bio Ritmo =

Bio Ritmo ("Salsa Machine") is an American salsa band based in Richmond, Virginia formed in 1991. The name Bio Ritmo is a Spanglish word play on the term Biorhythm, the hypothetical description for the rhythm of life.

The eight- to ten-member ensemble, led by Marlysse Simmons, is known for a classic Nuyorican salsa sound made famous by the Fania All Stars in the 1970s, that combines African Caribbean rhythms from son, bomba, plena, and samba with electronica and big band brass.

Founded in the early 1990s, they started out as a part of the Virginia college band scene that included other, then indie, acts such as Dave Matthews Band and Fighting Gravity.

In November 2004, the Salsa Machine won the Disc Makers Independent Music World Series (IMWS) Northeast finals held at The Lion's Den in New York City and earned the title of "Top Independent Act in the Northeast." They were finalists in the 2004 Independent Music Awards – Latin Category.

Following their critically acclaimed 2003 self-titled release, Bio Ritmo released its EP, Salsa System, produced by Jon Fausty. In September 2008, Bio Ritmo released their LP Bionico, recorded by Lance Koehler and mixed and mastered by Jon Fausty.

In September 2011, Bio Ritmo released their LP La Verdad, celebrating 20 years of original salsa music.

== Band ==
- Rei Alvarez: vocals, guiro (original member)
- Giustino Riccio: timbal, coro, clave, drumset (original member)
- Bob Miller: trumpet, coro, synth (original member)
- Marlysse Simmons: piano, Farfisa organ (leader)
- Tobias Whitaker: trombone
- Mark Ingraham: trumpet
- Edward Prendergast: bass
- Michael Montañez: bongó
- Hector "Coco" Barez: conga
- JC Kuhl: saxophone
- John Lilley: saxophone
- Gabo Tomasini: conga (original member)

== Discography ==
- "Piraguero", 7" single, Merge Records, 1995
- Que Siga la Musica, Album, Shameless Records, 1996
- Salsa Galactica, Album, Permanent Records, 1997
- Rumba Baby Rumba!, Album, Mercury / Triloka records, 1998
- Bio Ritmo (self-titled) Album, Independent release, Locutor Records, 2004
- Salsa System, EP, Independent release, Locutor Records, 2006
- Bionico, Album, Locutor Records, 2008
- "Lisandra" / "Shoe Shine", 7" single, Locutor Records, 2009
- "Dina's Mambo" / "La Muralla", 7" single, Electric Cowbell Records, 2011
- La Verdad, Album, Electric Cowbell Records, 2011
- "Carnaval", Digital single, Vampisoul Records, 2014
- Puerta del Sur, Album, Vampisoul Records, 2014
- "Oriza", 7" single, Peace and Rhythm Records, 2015
- "Señor Locutor", Digital single, 2016

== Performances ==
Bio Ritmo has toured the United States and has also performed in Canada, Puerto Rico, France, and the Republic of Georgia.

Bio Ritmo has shared the stage with Mambo King Tito Puente, as well as Poncho Sanchez, Squirrel Nut Zippers, Timbalaye, Tambo, Ozomatli, Steel Pulse, Burning Spear, Morphine, G Love and Special Sauce, Wilco, Southern Culture on the Skids, Frankie Vazquez, La Familia Quintero, La Sonora Ponceña, Bloque 53, and Diabloson.

On January 14, 2006, Bio Ritmo performed at the Inaugural Ball for Commonwealth of Virginia Governor Tim Kaine in Williamsburg, Virginia at the College of William & Mary.

In August 2010, Bio Ritmo toured the Republic of Georgia and performed for President Saakashvili.

In September 2011, Bio Ritmo performed in Dax, France at the Toros y Salsa Festival.

On September 23, 2011, Bio Ritmo celebrated its 20th anniversary.
