= Patrice King Brown =

American television journalist and news anchor

- Occupations: Television journalist, news anchor, talk-show host
- Years active: c. 1978–2011
- Employer: CBS Television / KDKA-TV
- Known for: CBS Television, KDKA-TV Eyewitness News, Pittsburgh 2Day
- Children: 2

Patrice King Brown is an American television journalist, news anchor, talk-show host, and media personality best known for her more than three decades with CBS affiliate KDKA-TV in Pittsburgh, Pennsylvania. She received the National Academy of Television Arts & Sciences (NATAS) Lifetime Achievement Emmy Award in 2011, one of the highest honors in broadcast television.

Patrice King Brown became known for her work in news broadcasting, celebrity interviews, community affairs, and lifestyle programming. Over the course of her broadcasting career, she interviewed political leaders, entertainers, athletes, authors, and cultural figures including Bob Hope, Dean Martin, Jerry Lewis, Elizabeth Taylor, Charlton Heston, Tom Hanks, Robin Williams, Oprah Winfrey, Tom Cruise, Goldie Hawn, Kevin Costner, Justin Timberlake, and Christina Aguilera. She also interviewed every First Lady of the United States since Lady Bird Johnson, with the exception of Jacqueline Kennedy Onassis, as well as Barack Obama on the day of his election victory in 2008.

== Early life and education ==
Patrice King was raised in the Sheraden neighborhood of Pittsburgh, Pennsylvania, alongside her brothers Dave King and Brett King. The Pittsburgh Post-Gazette later referred to the siblings as the "Three Kings" of Sheraden.

As a teenager, Patrice King won the title of Miss Teen Pennsylvania and finished as runner-up in the Miss Teen America pageant.

She later received a full scholarship to West Virginia University to study theater and performance.

== Broadcasting career ==
Patrice King Brown joined KDKA-TV, the longtime CBS affiliate in Pittsburgh, where she built a broadcasting career spanning more than 33 years.

Early in her tenure at KDKA-TV, Patrice King Brown co-hosted the afternoon lifestyle and entertainment program Pittsburgh 2Day.

Comedian Dennis Miller was among the entertainers and personalities who appeared in connection with Pittsburgh 2Day during Patrice King Brown's years with the program.

Patrice King Brown later joined the station's Eyewitness News team and became one of the first African-American women in the United States to anchor both the 6 p.m. and 11 p.m. evening newscasts.

During Patrice King Brown's years at KDKA-TV, the newscasts she anchored were among the highest-rated local television newscasts in Pittsburgh.

Patrice King Brown interviewed entertainers and public figures including Bob Hope, Dean Martin, Jerry Lewis, Charlton Heston, Elizabeth Taylor, Kevin Costner, Tom Hanks, Robin Williams, Dennis Miller, Oprah Winfrey, George Lopez, Lionel Richie, Christina Aguilera, and Justin Timberlake.

Her interviews also included local and national political leaders, authors, and every First Lady of the United States since Lady Bird Johnson, with the exception of Jacqueline Kennedy Onassis. Patrice King Brown also interviewed Barack Obama on the day of his election victory in 2008.

Patrice King Brown also interviewed numerous sports figures associated with Pittsburgh, including members of the Pittsburgh Steelers organization and several Pro Football Hall of Fame players.

Over the course of her broadcasting career, Patrice King Brown supported and helped raise funds for numerous charitable organizations and community causes, including Sojourner House, South Hills Family Hospice, POWER, NEED, Tix for Kids, and Ozanam.

== Awards and honors ==
Patrice King Brown received multiple Emmy Awards during her broadcasting career. Along with co-anchor Stacy Smith, Patrice King Brown earned a Mid-Atlantic Emmy Award for coverage of the 1994 crash of US Air Flight 427 near Aliquippa, Pennsylvania.

Patrice King Brown received the Richard Caliguiri Award for Best Ambassador for Pittsburgh in 1999.

In 2002, Patrice King Brown was named one of Vectors’ “Women of the Year in Communications.”

Patrice King Brown additionally received the Lifetime Achievement in Broadcasting honor from the Pittsburgh Press Club in 2003.

Patrice King Brown was named one of the "50 Most Influential Women in Pennsylvania" in 2004 and 2007.

In 2007, Patrice King Brown received the Bill Burns Award for Outstanding Achievement in Journalism from the Rooney Foundation and Catholic Youth Association.

In 2011, Patrice King Brown received the Board of Governors Award, an Emmy lifetime achievement honor and one of the highest distinctions in television broadcasting, presented by the National Academy of Television Arts & Sciences.

Following her retirement from KDKA-TV in 2011 after more than three decades at the station, the City of Pittsburgh proclaimed "Patrice King Brown Day."

== Personal life ==
Patrice King Brown has two children, Guy and Lauren.

Patrice King Brown married Dr. Paul Nemiroff, a surgeon and medical broadcaster who served as Chief of Surgery at Cedars-Sinai Medical Center in Los Angeles. Nemiroff also worked as chief medical correspondent for KCBS-TV in Los Angeles and later for KDKA-TV.

Patrice King Brown's brothers also established careers in media and entertainment. Dave King became known as an on-air television host for QVC and ShopNBC, in addition to acting appearances in television and film. Brett King worked as a creative executive with studios including Paramount Pictures, Warner Bros., and Sony Pictures.
