= Brad Yoder (musician) =

American songwriter

Brad Yoder is a songwriter/performer who resides in Pittsburgh. He is well known in the Pittsburgh music scene, and his music has appeared in television shows such as NUMB3RS and Dawson's Creek. He was voted "Best Acoustic Artist" by readers of the Pittsburgh City Paper in 2003, 2004, 2006 and 2007.

== Discography ==
- Best Sunday Heart (1997)
- Talk to Total Strangers (1999)
- Used (2002)
- Someday or Never (2007)
- Excellent Trouble (2010)
- Somewhere in the Constellation (2024)
