= The Gathering Field =

- Origin: Pittsburgh, Pennsylvania, United States
- Genres: Rock
- Years active: 1994–2002, 2013-present
- Label: Atlantic Records
- Past members: Dave Brown; Bill Deasy; Jim DiSpirito; Eric Riebling; Joe Zelek
- Website: Gatheringfield.com

The Gathering Field is an American rock quartet from Pittsburgh, Pennsylvania, which recorded five albums from 1994 until 2001. They went on hiatus in 2002 and reunited in 2013.

== History ==
=== Formation ===
The Gathering Field legacy began in a burned-out third floor in Grove City, Pennsylvania, when Bill Deasy, Dave Brown and Rusted Root percussionist Jim DiSpirito "isolated themselves for the weekend with guitars, tequila, microphones and recording gear". An obscure, rare recording was born out of that weekend, appropriately titled "The Lost Weekend", which was never made commercially available.

=== Career ===
The Gathering Field line-up ultimately became Deasy on vocals and acoustic guitar, Brown on lead guitar, Eric Riebling on bass and Ray DeFade as drummer. Their first independent release, the self-titled The Gathering Field, was met with great reception around the region and they started playing to packed clubs. However, the band's popularity really skyrocketed when one of the region's most powerful rock radio stations, WDVE, began playing a song called, "Lost in America". The song remained in rotation for over seven months. Based on the success of the self-titled CD, the group garnered a major label deal with Atlantic Records, who re-released their album.

Soon after they signed to Atlantic Records and "Lost in America" was re-released, there was turmoil at the label. The album charted on the Billboard Top 100 album chart, Radio and Records and various other industry publications but ultimately the CD and group got lost in the shuffle and they attempted to be released from their contract. DeFade left the group and was replaced with Joe Zelek. When they finally succeeded, they released two more CDs; Reliance and So Close to Home, the latter consisting of songs the band had played live for several years but never recorded. During that time Deasy also released a semi-acoustic solo album called Spring Lies Waiting, produced by Brown.

=== Hiatus ===
Refusing to use the words "break-up" when describing their status, The Gathering Field went on an "infinite hiatus" in 2002.

Deasy now records as a solo artist and continues to be a prolific songwriter. His song "Good Things Are Happening" was the theme for ABC's Good Morning America from 2001 to 2004. Since his departure from The Gathering Field, he has performed with artists such as Bob Dylan, Bruce Springsteen, John Mellencamp and Patty Griffin. His music has been recorded by Martina McBride, Billy Ray Cyrus, Howard Jones, Kim Richey and The Clarks.

Zelek formed the Joe Zelek Band. They had their music used by television stations such as WTOV in Steubenville, Ohio, WFTV in Orlando, Florida, and Fox Sports West in Los Angeles, California. The band has also played the main stage at the Jamboree in the Hills since 2007.

Riebling continues to record music, and has emerged as a web designer for several artists and groups that he has been associated with.

=== Reunion ===
In November 2013, Bill Deasy announced during an interview on WYEP that the Gathering Field was reuniting and would immediately begin playing live shows again. He also announced that they would release a new album in the spring of 2014.

== Discography ==
- The Gathering Field (self-released, 1994)
- Lost in America (Atlantic Records, 1996)
- Reliance (Onoma Records, 1999)
- So Close to Home (Mudpuppy Records, 2001)
- Wild Journey (2014)
