= Hans Orifice =

American drummer

- Born: Jim Thomson; Alexandria, Virginia, U.S.
- Genres: Punk rock Shock rock
- Occupations: Drummer, Record Producer, Label Manager, Band Manager, Production Manager, Concert Promoter
- Instrument: Drums
- Years active: 1987, 1989
- Labels: Shimmy Disc; Metal Blade Records; DRT Entertainment; Slave Pit Inc.
- Website: Gwar official site

Hans Orifice is a drummer best known as a member of Gwar. Born Jim Thomson, in Alexandria, Virginia, he first took the name Hans Sphincter, and assumed his current name in 1987. Thomson left due to touring commitments with his main band, the Alter Natives, who released three albums on SST Records. Richmond drummer Rob Mosby of the Richmond, Virginia punk group White Cross then joined Gwar until 1989. Hans Orifice returned briefly in 1989 after Mosby left the group. During this time Thomson co-wrote Sick of You with the band and completed a U.S. and Canadian tour. After the tour, Thomson left Gwar on good terms to tour with The Alter Natives. He was replaced by current drummer Jizmak Da Gusha.

In 2000, Thomson joined Bob Miller, and formed an experimental group called Plasmodium. The group released Clairaudience in 2004. Thomson joined Brooklyn-based CSC Funk Band as a drummer and percussionist in 2008. In 2010 he started Electric Cowbell Records, a boutique record label releasing mostly 7-inch 45 rpm records for genre-bending music groups culled from his extended community and network of musicians and music producers. In 2011, The Village Voice voted Electric Cowbell Records the Best Spearheaders of the Vinyl Revival. The label released several acclaimed 45 rpm 7-inch records for a variety of groups like Superhuman Happiness, Debo Band, CSC Funk Band, Talibam!, Cheick Hamala Diabate, Bio Ritmo, Mucca Pazza, Amazing Ghost, Greg Ginn, Spanglish Fly, Super Hi Fi, No BS! Brass, Chico Trujillo, Orquesta el Macabeo, Slavic Soul Party, Polyrhythmics, Os Magrelos, and Karthala 72.

As of 2025, he is active in the group Motherfuckers JMB & Co. with Brian Weitz (Geologist of Animal Collective), and Marc Minsker.

== Discography ==
- With The Alter Natives: Hold Your Tongue (SST Records, 1986), Group Therapy (SST Records, 1987), Buzz (SST Records, 1989), Alter Natives/Carnival of Souls split 7-inch (L'Âge d'or Records, Germany, 1990)
- With Hotel X: A Random History of the Avant-Groove (SST Records, 1992), Residential Suite (SST Records, 1993), Ladders (SST Records, 1994)
- With Bio Ritmo: El Piraguero 7-inch (Merge Records), Que Siga La Musica (Shameless Records, 1995), Salsa Galactica (Permanent Records, 1997), Rumba Baby Rumba (Mercury Records, 1998)
- With The Dave Brockie Experience: The Dave Brockie Experience (Metal Blade Records, 2001)
- With Patrick Phelan: Parlor (Jagjaguwar, 2001)
- With The Griefbirds: Paper Radio (Planetary Records, 2001)
- With Pan American: Pan American (Kranky Records, Kranky 025)
- With Anthony Curtis and Boom: Squint (Field of Sound Records, 1994)
- With Trixie Delicious and the Lott Lizards: Bring Me Men (Don't Mess With Trixie Records, 2003)
- With Broken Hips: Broken Hips (Self-Released, 2003)
- With Tulsa Drone: No Wake (Dry County Records, 2003)
- With Plasmodium: Clairaudience (Dry County Records, 2004)
- With USA Is A Monster R.I.P. (Northern Spy Records, 2010)
- With CSC Funk Band: Bad Banana Bread (Electric Cowbell Records, 2010), A Troll's Soiree (Electric Cowbell Records, 2010), Things Are Getting Too Casual (Fat Beats, 2011)
- With Time Is Fire: Time Is Fire (Electric Cowbell Records, 2015), In Pieces (Electric Cowbell Records, 2020)
- With Motherfuckers JMB & Co.: Music Excitement Action! Beauty! (Via Parigi, 2025)
