= List of bass guitarists =

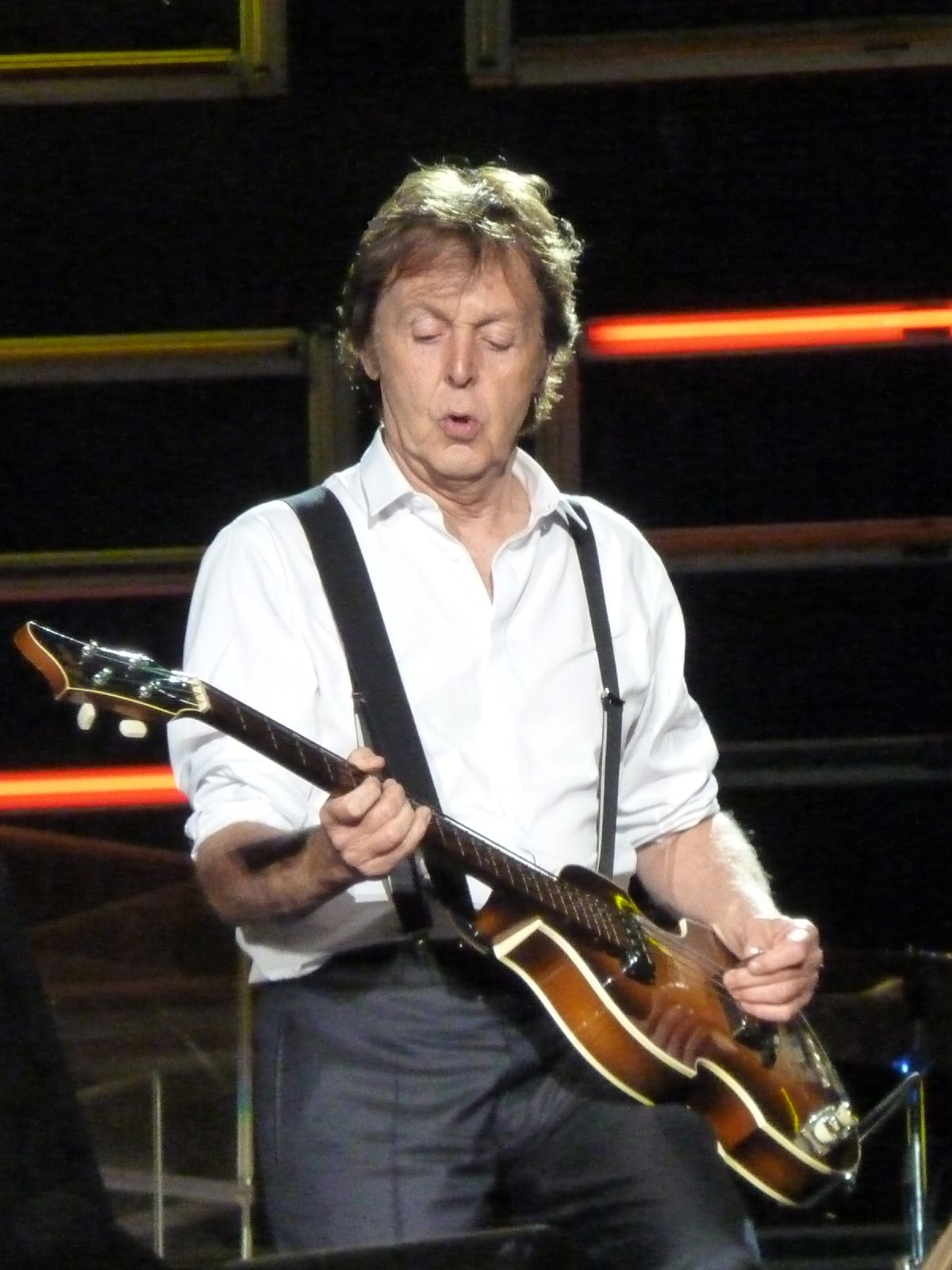
Former Beatle Paul McCartney is a well-known bass guitarist, singer, songwriter and multi-instrumentalist.

The following is a list of notable electric bass guitar players. The bass guitar is a stringed instrument played primarily with the fingers (either by plucking, slapping, popping, or tapping) or using a pick. Since the 1950s, the electric bass guitar has largely replaced the double bass in popular music. Bass guitarists provide the low-pitched basslines and bass runs in many different styles of music ranging from rock and metal to blues and jazz. Bassists also use the bass guitar as a soloing instrument in jazz, fusion, Latin, funk, and in some rock styles. Musicians known mainly as guitarists are listed separately in the list of guitarists.

For double bass players, see List of classical double bass players; List of jazz bassists, which includes both double bass and electric bass players; and List of double bassists in popular music, which includes blues, folk, country, etc.

For females, see List of female bass guitarists

== A ==
- Barry Adamson (Magazine, Visage, Nick Cave and the Bad Seeds)
- Paul Abrahams (The Reels)
- Gaye Advert (The Adverts)
- Martin Eric Ain (Celtic Frost, Hellhammer)
- Dominic Aitchison (Mogwai)
- Kianna Alarid (Tilly and the Wall)
- Mike de Albuquerque (Electric Light Orchestra)
- Arioch (Funeral Mist)
- Juan Alderete (Racer X, The Mars Volta)
- Miša Aleksić (Riblja Čorba)
- Dave Alexander (The Stooges)
- James Alexander (Bar-Kays)
- Lee Alexander (Norah Jones)
- Rustee Allen (Sly and the Family Stone)
- Merle Allin (The Murder Junkies)
- Karl Alvarez (Descendents)
- Thierry Amar (Godspeed You! Black Emperor, Thee Silver Mt. Zion Memorial Orchestra, Black Ox Orkestar)
- Jeff Ament (Pearl Jam)
- Mårten Andersson (Lizzy Borden, George Lynch)
- Mark Andes (Heart, Spirit)
- Felipe Andreoli (Angra)
- Jeff Michael Andrews
- Dan Andriano (Alkaline Trio)
- Josh Ansley (Catch 22, Streetlight Manifesto, HURT)
- Michael Anthony (Van Halen, Planet Us, Sammy Hagar and the Waboritas, Chickenfoot)
- Daniel Antonsson (Dark Tranquillity)
- Tom Araya (Slayer)
- Doug Ardito (Puddle of Mudd)
- Reginald Arvizu (Korn, L.A.P.D.)
- Brent Ashley (Combichrist, Violent New Breed)
- Talena Atfield (Kittie)
- Melissa Auf der Maur (Hole, The Smashing Pumpkins, Auf Der Maur)
- Eric Avery (Jane's Addiction, Alanis Morissette)
- John Avila (Oingo Boingo)
- Kevin Ayers (Soft Machine)
- Pedro Aznar (Serú Girán, Pat Metheny Group)
- Nathan Azarcon (Rivermaya, Bamboo (Filipino band))

== B ==
- Bob Babbitt (The Funk Brothers, MFSB)
- Matt Bachand (Act of Defiance)
- Johnny Bacolas (Alice N' Chains, Second Coming)
- Pat Badger (Extreme, Tribe of Judah)
- Steve Bailey (Bass Extremes)
- Victor Bailey (Weather Report)
- Alec Baillie (Leftöver Crack)
- Harvey Bainbridge (Hawkwind)
- Brian Baker (Minor Threat)
- Ronnie Baker (MFSB, The Trammps, Salsoul Orchestra)
- Carlos Balcells (The Dawn)
- Peter Baltes (Accept)
- Michael Balzary aka Flea (Red Hot Chili Peppers)
- Hugh Banton (Van der Graaf Generator)
- Tony Barber (Buzzcocks)
- Paul Barker (The Blackouts, Ministry, Revolting Cocks, Lard, U.S.S.A.)
- Lou Barlow (Dinosaur Jr.)
- Tom Barney (The Honeydrippers)
- Aston "Family Man" Barrett (Bob Marley and the Wailers)
- Arthur Barrow (Frank Zappa)
- Wilbur Bascomb (Jeff Beck)
- Colin Bass (3 Mustaphas 3, Camel)
- Jens Becker (Grave Digger)
- Walter Becker (Steely Dan)
- Mark Bedford (Madness, Voice of the Beehive)
- Robert Levon Been (Black Rebel Motorcycle Club)
- Garry Gary Beers (INXS)
- Nick Beggs (Kajagoogoo, Iona)
- Andy Bell (Oasis)
- Robert Bell (Kool & the Gang)
- Matt Bellamy (The Jaded Hearts Club)
- Bryan Beller (Steve Vai, Mike Keneally, Dethklok)
- Frank Bello (Anthrax, Helmet)
- Carles Benavent (Paco de Lucía, Chick Corea, Miles Davis)
- Jo Bench (Bolt Thrower)
- Martin Bengtsson (Arch Enemy, Armageddon)
- Max Bennett (L.A. Express, The Wrecking Crew)
- Jay Bentley (Bad Religion)
- Glen Benton (Deicide)
- Jeff Berlin
- Guy Berryman (Coldplay)
- Alonza Bevan (Kula Shaker)
- Davide Biale (Davie504)
- Owen Biddle (The Roots)
- Bob Birch (Elton John)
- Mike Bishop (Gwar, Kepone)
- Matt Bissonette (David Lee Roth, Ringo Starr, Elton John)
- Jonas Björler (At the Gates, The Haunted)
- Bill Black (Elvis Presley)
- Lori Black (Clown Alley, Melvins)
- Morty Black (TNT)
- Jack Blades (Night Ranger, Damn Yankees, Shaw Blades)
- Ron Blair (Tom Petty and the Heartbreakers)
- Johan Blomqvist (Backyard Babies)
- Vicki Blue (The Runaways)
- Bobzilla (Damageplan, Hellyeah)
- Andrew Bodnar (The Rumour, Graham Parker)
- Henry Bogdan (Helmet)
- Tim Bogert (Vanilla Fudge)
- Rachel Bolan (Skid Row, Prunella Scales)
- Trevor Bolder (David Bowie's The Spiders from Mars, Wishbone Ash, Uriah Heep)
- Richard Bona
- Steve Boone (Lovin' Spoonful)
- Zeta Bosio (Soda Stereo)
- Chris Bostock (JoBoxers, Dave Stewart and the Spiritual Cowboys, Subway Sect)
- Pierre Bouvier (Reset, Simple Plan)
- Shanne Bradley (The Nipple Erectors, The Nips, The Men They Couldn't Hang)
- Jon Brant (Cheap Trick, Siren, Jason & the Scorchers)
- Beverly Breckenridge (Fifth Column, Phono-Comb)
- Andrés Bretel (TK, Madre Matilda, Space Bee, Carlos Salas)
- Dan Briggs (Between the Buried and Me)
- Eric Brittingham (Cinderella)
- Brian Bromberg
- Harvey Brooks (Miles Davis, Bob Dylan, The Doors, Mike Bloomfield)
- David Brown (Santana)
- Mark Brown (Prince and the Revolution)
- Phillipa 'Pip' Brown
- Ray Brown (Oscar Peterson, Ella Fitzgerald, The L.A. Four)
- Rex Brown (Pantera, Down, Rebel Meets Rebel)
- Scott Brown (Trooper)
- Baron Browne (Jean-Luc Ponty, Billy Cobham, Vital Information)
- Chris Brubeck (The Dave Brubeck Quartet)
- Jack Bruce (Cream)
- Bunny Brunel (CAB)
- Stephen "Thundercat" Bruner
- Bob Brunning (Fleetwood Mac)
- Francis Buchholz (Scorpions)
- Sibyl Buck (The Lonely Astronauts)
- Nicholas Bullen (Napalm Death)
- Oteil Burbridge (The Allman Brothers Band)
- Ian Burden (The Human League)
- Hunter Burgan (AFI)
- Mike Burkett (NOFX)
- Jean-Jacques Burnel (The Stranglers)
- Rob Burns (Nucleus)
- Boz Burrell (King Crimson, Bad Company)
- Heinz Burt (The Tornados)
- Cliff Burton (Trauma, Metallica)
- Bob Bushnell
- Geezer Butler (Black Sabbath, Heaven and Hell, GZR, Ozzy Osbourne)
- Michael Butler (Exodus, American Heartbreak, Jetboy, Chad Bushnell)
- Tim Butler (The Psychedelic Furs, Love Spit Love)
- Tony Butler (Big Country)

== C ==
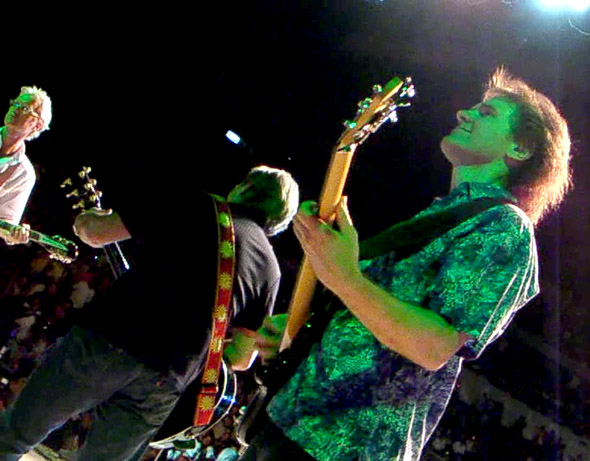
Richard Campbell with America

- Tommy Caldwell (The Marshall Tucker Band)
- John Cale (The Velvet Underground)
- Emperor Magus Caligula (Dark Funeral)
- Bernie Calvert (The Hollies)
- Jon Camp (Renaissance)
- Ben Campbell (Zed)
- Richard Campbell (Natalie Cole, Dave Mason, Three Dog Night, Chuck Negron, America)
- Tony Campos (Fear Factory, Ministry, Soulfly, Prong, Static-X)
- Marciano Cantero (Enanitos Verdes)
- Captain Sensible (The Damned)
- Alain Caron (Uzeb)
- Will Carruthers (The Brian Jonestown Massacre, Spacemen 3)
- Julian Casablancas
- Jack Casady (Jefferson Airplane, Hot Tuna)
- Gerald Casale (Devo)
- Ken Casey (Dropkick Murphys)
- Martyn P. Casey (Nick Cave and the Bad Seeds, Grinderman, The Triffids)
- Charlie Cawood (Knifeworld, Lost Crowns, the Anchoress, Kyros)
- Louis Cennamo
- Michael Cera (Mister Heavenly)
- Peter Cetera (Chicago)
- Clive Chaman (Jeff Beck, Brian Auger)
- Justin Chancellor (Tool)
- Chas Chandler (The Animals)
- Chris Chaney (The Panic Channel, Jane's Addiction, Methods of Mayhem, AC/DC)
- Jeremy Chatelain (Jets to Brazil, Helmet)
- Stuart Chatwood (The Tea Party)
- Joe Chemay
- Chi Cheng (Deftones)
- Tony Choy (Atheist)
- Greg Christian (Testament)
- Don Ciccone (Frankie Valli and The Four Seasons, The Critters)
- Al Cisneros (Sleep, Om)
- Annie Clark
- Mark Clarke (Colosseum, Uriah Heep, Mountain)
- Stanley Clarke (Return to Forever)
- Les Claypool (Primus, Colonel Les Claypool's Fearless Flying Frog Brigade, Oysterhead, Colonel Claypool's Bucket of Bernie Brains, Blind Illusion, The Claypool Lennon Delirium)
- Adam Clayton (U2)
- Jemaine Clement (Flight of the Conchords)
- Rod Clements (Lindisfarne)
- Jim Clench (April Wine, Bachman–Turner Overdrive)
- Bud Cockrell (Pablo Cruise)
- Tommy Cogbill (The Memphis Boys, Muscle Shoals Rhythm Section)
- T. Michael Coleman (Doc Watson)
- Bootsy Collins (James Brown, Parliament-Funkadelic, Bootsy's Rubber Band, Science Faxtion)
- Max Collins (Eve 6, The Sugi Tap)
- Johnny Colt (The Black Crowes, Train)
- Tim Commerford (Rage Against the Machine, Audioslave)
- Van Conner (Screaming Trees)
- Norman Cook (The Housemartins)
- Stu Cook (Creedence Clearwater Revival)
- John Cooper (Skillet)
- Glenn Cornick (Jethro Tull)
- Andy Cousin (All About Eve, The Lucy Nation, The Mission)
- Duncan Coutts (Our Lady Peace)
- Billy Cox (Jimi Hendrix, Band of Gypsys, Charlie Daniels Band)
- Mikey Craig (Culture Club)
- Robbie Crane (Ratt, Vince Neil Band, Adler's Appetite, Love/Hate, Vertex)
- Evan Cranley (Broken Social Scene, Stars)
- Bob Cranshaw (Sonny Rollins)
- Jim Creeggan (Barenaked Ladies)
- Chris Cross (Ultravox)
- Juan Croucier (Dokken, Ratt)
- Sheryl Crow
- Rick Cua
- Sal Cuevas (Fania All-Stars)
- Justin Currie (Del Amitri)
- André Cymone (Prince & the Revolution)
- Holger Czukay (Can)

== D ==
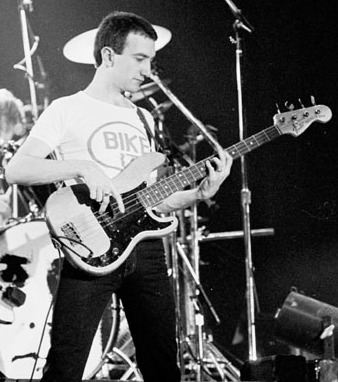
John Deacon performing with Queen in 1979

- Patrick Dahlheimer (Live)
- Bob Daisley (Ozzy Osbourne, Gary Moore)
- Bobby Dall (Poison)
- John Dalton (The Kinks)
- George Daly (The Hangmen)
- Mike Daly (Whiskeytown, Grace Potter and the Nocturnals)
- Paul D'Amour (Tool)
- Sharlee D'Angelo (Mercyful Fate, King Diamond, Arch Enemy)
- Traa Daniels (P.O.D.)
- Rick Danko (The Band)
- Mike D'Antonio (Killswitch Engage)
- Mike Davenport (The Ataris, Versus the World)
- Alan Davey (Hawkwind)
- Stuart David (Belle and Sebastian, Looper)
- Jeremy Davis (Paramore)
- Michael Davis (MC5)
- Steve Davy (Steamhammer)
- John Deacon (Queen)
- Kim Deal (Pixies, The Breeders)
- Mike Dean (Corrosion of Conformity)
- Victoria De Angelis (Måneskin)
- Chuck Deardorf (Jovino Santos-Neto)
- Johan De Farfalla
- Vance DeGeneres (The Cold)
- Matt Deis (CKY, All That Remains)
- Robert DeLeo (Stone Temple Pilots, Army of Anyone)
- Rob De Luca (Spread Eagle, UFO)
- Joey DeMaio (Manowar)
- Jay DeMarcus (Rascal Flatts)
- Michael Dempsey (The Cure, Associates, Levinhurst)
- Carlos Dengler (Interpol)
- Paul Denman (Sade)
- Rob Derhak (moe.)
- John DeServio (Black Label Society)
- Dr. Matt Destruction (The Hives)
- Blu DeTiger
- Mark Deutrom (Melvins)
- James Dewar (Robin Trower)
- Mohini Dey
- Paul Di Leo (Nena, Adrenaline Mob, Fozzy)
- Bill "The Buddha" Dickens
- Steve Diggle (Buzzcocks)
- Allie DiMeco (the Naked Brothers Band)
- Mike Dirnt (Green Day, Foxboro Hot Tubs, The Network, The Frustrators, Screeching Weasel)
- John Doe (X)
- Lawrence Donegan (Lloyd Cole and the Commotions, The Bluebells)
- Lee Dorman (Iron Butterfly, Captain Beyond)
- Gail Ann Dorsey (David Bowie)
- Chip Douglas (The Turtles, The Monkees)
- Dave Dreiwitz (Ween, Instant Death)
- Chris Dreja (The Yardbirds)
- Tim Drummond
- Uriah Duffy (Whitesnake, Lyrics Born, Christina Aguilera)
- Chuck Dukowski (Black Flag)
- Dennis Dunaway (Alice Cooper)
- Donald "Duck" Dunn (The Bar-Kays, The Mar-Keys, Booker T. & the M.G.'s, The Blues Brothers)
- Trevor Dunn (Mr. Bungle, Fantômas)
- Joe Duplantier (Gojira, Cavalera Conspiracy)
- David Dyson (Brainstorm, New Kids on the Block, Pieces of a Dream)

== E ==
- Robin "Graves" Eaglestone (Cradle of Filth)
- Jimmy Earl (The Crusaders, Stanley Clarke, Chick Corea, Pino Daniele, Robben Ford, Cleto and the Cletones)
- Nathan East (Fourplay, Toto, Eric Clapton)
- Kai Eckhardt (Garaj Mahal)
- Leif Edling (Krux)
- Bernard Edwards (Chic)
- John 'Rhino' Edwards (Status Quo)
- Richie Edwards (The Darkness)
- Colin Edwin (Porcupine Tree)
- Mike Elizondo
- David Ellefson (Megadeth, Avian)
- Atom Ellis (Psychefunkapus, Dieselhed)
- Keith Ellis (The Koobas, Van der Graaf Generator)
- Ben Ely (Regurgitator)
- Shane Embury (Napalm Death)
- Bjorn Englen (Dio Disciples, Soul Sign, Yngwie Malmsteen, Tony MacAlpine, Uli Jon Roth, Quiet Riot, Robin McAuley)
- John Entwistle (The Who)
- Howie Epstein (Tom Petty and the Heartbreakers)
- Chris Eskola
- Roy Estrada (The Mothers of Invention, Little Feat, Captain Beefheart and The Magic Band)
- Deon Estus
- Chris Ethridge (The Flying Burrito Brothers, The Family)
- Ean Evans (Lynyrd Skynyrd)
- Mark Evans (AC/DC)
- Tom Evans (Badfinger)
- Jason Everman (Soundgarden)
- Tobias Exxel (Edguy)

== F ==
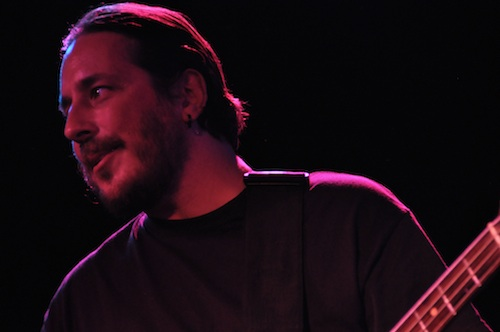
Scott Ford of Twilight Singers & Camp Freddy – Live in Concert

- Bob Fairfoull (Idlewild)
- Falco
- Pete Farndon (The Pretenders)
- Dave Farrell (Linkin Park)
- Sam Farrar (Phantom Planet)
- Chris Feinstein (Ryan Adams & the Cardinals)
- Wilton Felder
- Nick Feldman (Wang Chung)
- Ricky Fenson (The Rolling Stones, Brian Auger and the Trinity, Steampacket)
- Tracy Ferrie (Stryper)
- Jim Fielder (Buffalo Springfield, Blood, Sweat & Tears)
- Jennifer Finch (L7)
- Richard Finch (KC and the Sunshine Band)
- Steve Firth (Embrace)
- Brent Fischer (Clare Fischer, Elvis Schoenberg's Orchestre Surreal)
- Harley Flanagan (Cro-Mags)
- Gary Fletcher (The Blues Band)
- Klaus Flouride (Dead Kennedys)
- Herbie Flowers (Sky, Blue Mink, T. Rex, David Bowie, Elton John, George Harrison, Lou Reed)
- Ben Folds (Majosha)
- Foley (Miles Davis)
- Sharin Foo (The Raveonettes)
- Derek Forbes (Simple Minds)
- John Ford (Strawbs, The Monks)
- Maya Ford (The Donnas)
- Scott Ford (The Twilight Singers, The Gutter Twins, Camp Freddy)
- Mo Foster (Cliff Richard, Phil Collins, Frida)
- Murray Foster (Great Big Sea, Moxy Früvous)
- Tom Fowler (Frank Zappa & The Mothers of Invention)
- Jackie Fox (The Runaways)
- Bruce Foxton (The Jam, Stiff Little Fingers)
- Nikolai Fraiture (The Strokes)
- Tony Franklin (The Firm, Blue Murder)
- Andy Fraser (Free, Sharks)
- Freebo (Bonnie Raitt)
- Matt Freeman (Rancid, Operation Ivy)
- Peter Freeman (Jon Hassell)
- Janusz Frychel
- Chosei Funahara (Plasmatics)
- Misia Furtak (Très.b)
- Miki Furukawa (Supercar)
- Nick Fyffe (Jamiroquai)

== G ==
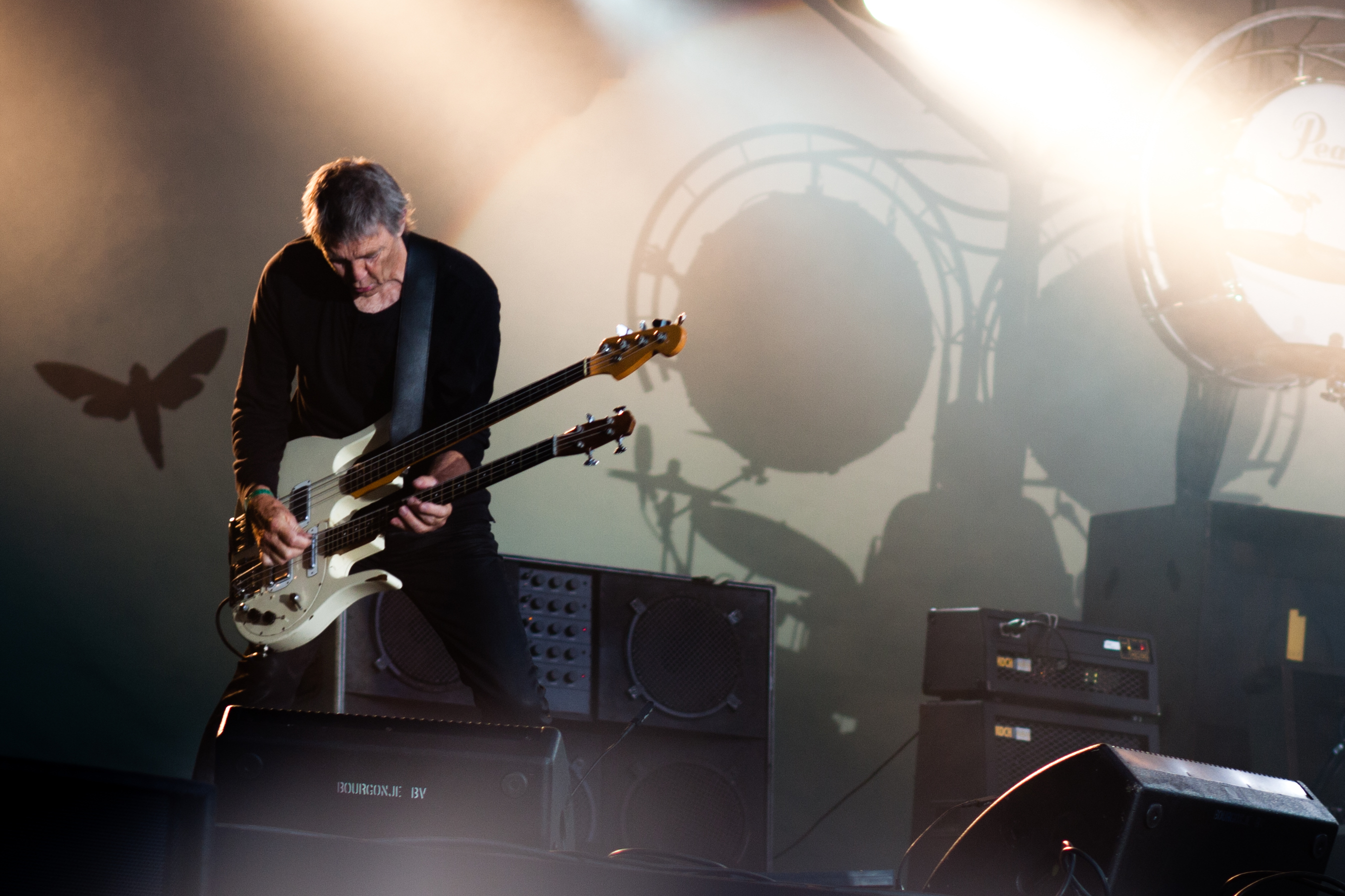
Rinus Gerritsen (Golden Earring)

- Tim Gaines (Stryper, SinDizzy)
- Noel Gallagher (Oasis)
- Simon Gallup (The Cure)
- Craig Gannon (Aztec Camera, The Bluebells, The Smiths)
- Greg Garbowsky (Jonas Brothers)
- Juan Garcia-Herreros
- Roberto García (WarCry)
- Paul Gardiner (Tubeway Army, Gary Numan)
- Chuck Garric (Alice Cooper)
- Matt Garrison
- Steve Garvey (Buzzcocks)
- Rosko Gee (Can, Traffic)
- Rinus Gerritsen (Golden Earring)
- Maurice Gibb (Bee Gees)
- Melvin Gibbs (Rollins Band)
- John Giblin (Phil Collins, Kate Bush, Peter Gabriel, Simple Minds)
- Brian Gibson (Lightning Bolt)
- Peter Gifford (Midnight Oil)
- Peter Giles (Giles, Giles and Fripp, King Crimson)
- Greg Ginn (Black Flag) Credited as Dale Nixon on My War
- Chad I Ginsburg (CKY)
- Joe Gittleman (The Mighty Mighty Bosstones, Avoid One Thing, Gang Green)
- John Glascock (Carmen, Jethro Tull)
- Bob Glaub
- Roger Glover (Deep Purple, Rainbow)
- Nicolas Godin (Air)
- Rodrigo González (Die Ärzte)
- Jimi Goodwin (Doves)
- Debbie Googe (My Bloody Valentine)
- Bruce Gordon (I Mother Earth)
- Kim Gordon (Sonic Youth)
- Martin Gordon (Sparks, Radio Stars, Jet, John's Children)
- Mike Gordon (Phish)
- Billy Gould (Faith No More)
- Graham Gouldman (10cc)
- Kenny Gradney (Little Feat, Delaney & Bonnie)
- Larry Graham (Sly and the Family Stone, Graham Central Station)
- Paul Gray (Eddie and the Hot Rods, The Damned, UFO)
- Paul Gray (Slipknot)
- Ric Grech (Family, Blind Faith, Traffic, Ginger Baker's Air Force)
- Edward Tony Green (The Dramatics, Death Row, G Funk )
- Max Green (Escape the Fate)
- Colin Greenwood (Radiohead)
- Billy Greer (Kansas)
- Paolo Gregoletto (Trivium)
- Mark Griffiths (The Shadows, Hank Marvin)
- Nigel Griggs (Split Enz)
- Markus Grosskopf (Helloween)
- Richard Grossman (Divinyls, Hoodoo Gurus)
- Kelly Groucutt (Electric Light Orchestra)
- Craig Gruber (Elf, Rainbow)
- Patrice Guers (Rhapsody of Fire)
- Trey Gunn (King Crimson)
- Rutger Gunnarsson (ABBA)
- Jeremy Guns (Brides of Destruction)
- Steve Gustafson (10,000 Maniacs)

== H ==
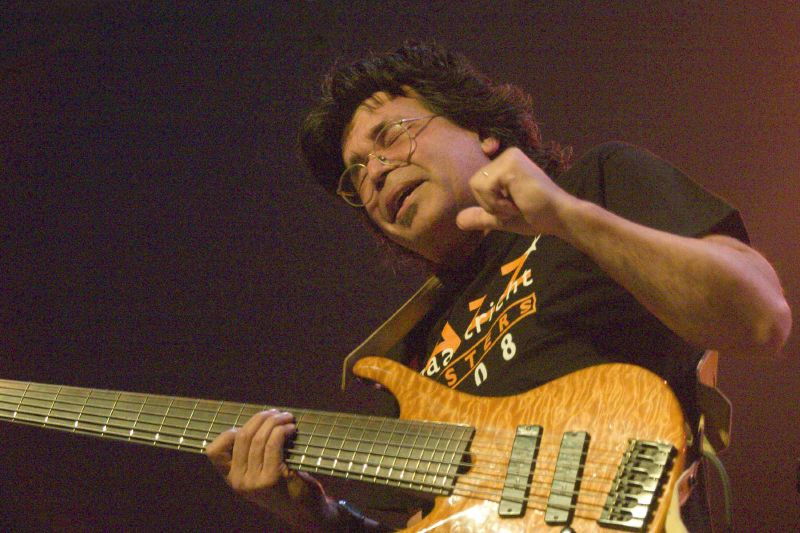
Left handed bassist Jimmy Haslip of the Yellowjackets

- Mikey Hachey (Suburban Legends)
- Kenny Håkansson (The Hellacopters)
- Janine Hall (The Saints, Weddings Parties Anything, Young Charlatans)
- Tom Hamilton (Aerosmith)
- Stuart Hamm (Joe Satriani, Steve Vai, Frank Gambale)
- Didz Hammond (The Cooper Temple Clause, Dirty Pretty Things)
- Fred Hammond (Commissioned)
- Jeffrey Hammond-Hammond (Jethro Tull)
- Steve Hanley (The Fall, The Lovers)
- Kathleen Hanna (Bikini Kill)
- Gerry Hannah (Subhumans)
- Timi Hansen (King Diamond, Mercyful Fate)
- Steve Hansgen (Minor Threat)
- Robert Hardy (Franz Ferdinand)
- Jet Harris (The Shadows)
- Steve Harris (Iron Maiden)
- Nigel Harrison (Blondie)
- Douglas Hart (The Jesus and Mary Chain)
- Gordon Haskell (The Fleur de Lys, King Crimson)
- Jimmy Haslip (Yellowjackets, Gino Vannelli)
- John Hassall (The Libertines)
- "Evil" Jared Hasselhoff (Bloodhound Gang)
- Juliana Hatfield (Blake Babies, Some Girls)
- Michel Hatzigeorgiou (Aka Moon)
- David Hayes (Southside Johnny and the Asbury Jukes)
- Heath (X Japan)
- Andrew Heermans (John Cale)
- Brian Helicopter (The Shapes)
- Richard Hell (The Voidoids)
- Jonas Hellborg (Bill Laswell, Shawn Lane, Buckethead)
- Svante Henryson (Yngwie Malmsteen)
- Marko Hietala (Nightwish, Tarot, Sinergy)
- Yutaka Higuchi (Buck-Tick)
- Dusty Hill (ZZ Top)
- Ian Hill (Judas Priest)
- Bones Hillman (Midnight Oil)
- Chris Hillman (The Byrds)
- Taka Hirose (Feeder)
- Derrick Hodge
- Leroy Hodges (Hi Rhythm Section)
- Colin Hodgkinson (Back Door, Ten Years After, Whitesnake)
- Devra Hoff (Good for Cows)
- Annie Holland (Elastica)
- Matt Hollywood (The Brian Jonestown Massacre)
- Georg Hólm (Sigur Rós)
- Calum Hood ( 5 Seconds of Summer)
- David Hood (Muscle Shoals Rhythm Section, Traffic)
- Peter Hook (New Order, Monaco, Joy Division)
- Dave Hope (Kansas)
- Hugh Hopper (Soft Machine)
- Mark Hoppus (Blink-182, +44)
- Trevor Horn (The Buggles)
- Brad Houser (Edie Brickell & New Bohemians)
- Hub (The Roots)
- Mike Huckabee (Capitol Offense)
- Mick Hucknall (Simply Red)
- Jim Hughart
- Glenn Hughes (Deep Purple, Trapeze, Black Sabbath)
- Jimmy Hughes (The Banned, Cowboys International, Original Mirrors, Department S)
- Peter Hughes (The Mountain Goats, DiskothiQ, Nothing Painted Blue)
- Peter Hume (Evermore)
- David Hungate (Toto)
- Carl Hunter (The Farm)
- Ashley Hutchings (Fairport Convention, Steeleye Span, The Albion Band)

== I ==
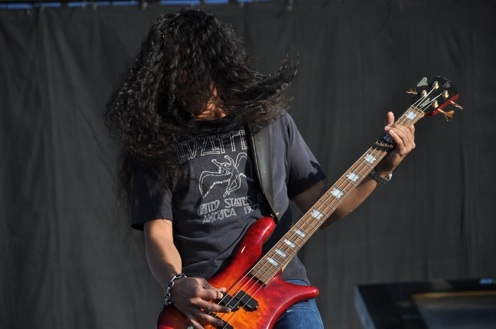
Mike Inez of Alice in Chains

- Mark Ibold (Pavement)
- John Illsley (Dire Straits)
- Michael Inez (Alice in Chains, Ozzy Osbourne)
- Infernus (Desekrator, Borknagar, Orcustus)
- Ricardo Iorio (V8, Hermética, Almafuerte)
- Jeff Irwin (Griffin House, Cerys Matthews, Mat Kearney, Eliot Morris)
- Fredrik Isaksson (Grave, Therion)
- Marvin Isley (The Isley Brothers)
- Hiroyuki Isobe (Alexandros)
- Michael Ivins (The Flaming Lips)
- Anders Iwers (Tiamat, Cemetary)
- Peter Iwers (In Flames)

== J ==
- J (Luna Sea)
- David J (Bauhaus)
- Anthony Jackson (Chick Corea, Paul Simon, MFSB, Quincy Jones)
- Eddie Jackson (Queensrÿche)
- Jackie Jackson (Toots and the Maytals)
- Jermaine Jackson (The Jackson 5)
- Lee Jackson (The Nice)
- Randy Jackson (Journey)
- Randy Jackson (The Jacksons)
- Marcel Jacob (Europe, Talisman)
- James Jamerson Sr. (The Funk Brothers)
- James Jamerson Jr. (Teena Marie)
- Alex James (Blur)
- Rick James
- Tony James (Generation X, Sigue Sigue Sputnik)
- Michael Janisch
- Álvaro Jardón (Darna, WarCry)
- Neil Jason (Cyndi Lauper, Dire Straits, Brecker Brothers, Roxy Music, Paul Simon, John Lennon, David Sanborn, Saturday Night Live Band, CBS Orchestra)
- Steve Jay ("Weird Al" Yankovic)
- Jerry Jemmott
- Darryl Jenifer (Bad Brains)
- Tom Jenkinson
- Waylon Jennings
- Todd Jensen (Journey)
- Jiro (Glay, The Predators)
- Chris Joannou (Silverchair)
- Phil Joel (Newsboys)
- Prakash John
- Alphonso Johnson (Weather Report, Santana, Phil Collins)
- Gordon Johnson
- Jimmy Johnson
- Louis Johnson (Michael Jackson, Quincy Jones, The Brothers Johnson)
- Bruce Johnston (The Beach Boys)
- James Johnston
- Darryl Jones (The Rolling Stones)
- John Paul Jones (Led Zeppelin, Them Crooked Vultures)
- Percy Jones (Brand X, Melon)
- Richard Jones (The Feeling, Sophie Ellis Bextor)
- Richard Jones (Stereophonics)
- Simon Jones (The Verve, The Shining)
- Steve Jones (Sex Pistols)
- Tyler Joseph (Twenty One Pilots)
- Eric Judy (Modest Mouse)
- Ju-ken (Gackt, Anna Tsuchiya, Vamps)
- Larry Junstrom (Lynyrd Skynyrd, 38 Special)
- Žika Jelić (YU Grupa)

== K ==
- Greg K. (The Offspring)
- Young K (Day6)
- John Kahn (Jerry Garcia Band)
- Jim Kale (The Guess Who)
- Tony Kanal (No Doubt)
- Arthur Kane (New York Dolls)
- Mick Karn (Japan)
- Junnosuke Kawaguchi (The Blue Hearts)
- Carol Kaye
- Dylan Keefe (Marcy Playground)
- Jesse F. Keeler (Death from Above 1979)
- Ace Kefford (The Move)
- Martin Kemp (Spandau Ballet)
- Rick Kemp (Steeleye Span)
- Ben Kenney (Incubus)
- Andy Kent (You Am I)
- Pierre Kezdy (Naked Raygun, Pegboy, Strike Under)
- Steve Kilbey (The Church)
- Ian "Lemmy" Kilmister (Motörhead)
- Tad Kinchla (Blues Traveler)
- King ov Hell
- Gary King
- Mark King (Level 42)
- Stove King (Mansun)
- Tim Kingsbury (Arcade Fire)
- Karl Kippenberger (Shihad)
- Cris Kirkwood (Meat Puppets)
- Kisaki (Phantasmagoria)
- Jonas Kjellgren (Raubtier)
- Grutle Kjellson (Enslaved)
- Anders Kjølholm (Volbeat)
- John Klingberg (Human Arts Ensemble, String Trio of New York)
- Larry Knechtel (The Wrecking Crew)
- Holly Knight (Device)
- Jerry Knight (Raydio, Ollie & Jerry)
- Ryota Kohama (One Ok Rock)
- Julian Koster (Neutral Milk Hotel)
- Ivan Král (Patti Smith)
- Geoff Kresge (Tiger Army, AFI)
- Chris Kringel (Æon Spoke)
- Bakithi Kumalo (Paul Simon)
- Hansi Kürsch (Blind Guardian)
- Adam Kury (Candlebox, Legs Diamond, The Kings Royal)
- Alexandr Kutikov (Mashina Vremeni)
- Brent Kutzle (OneRepublic)

== L ==
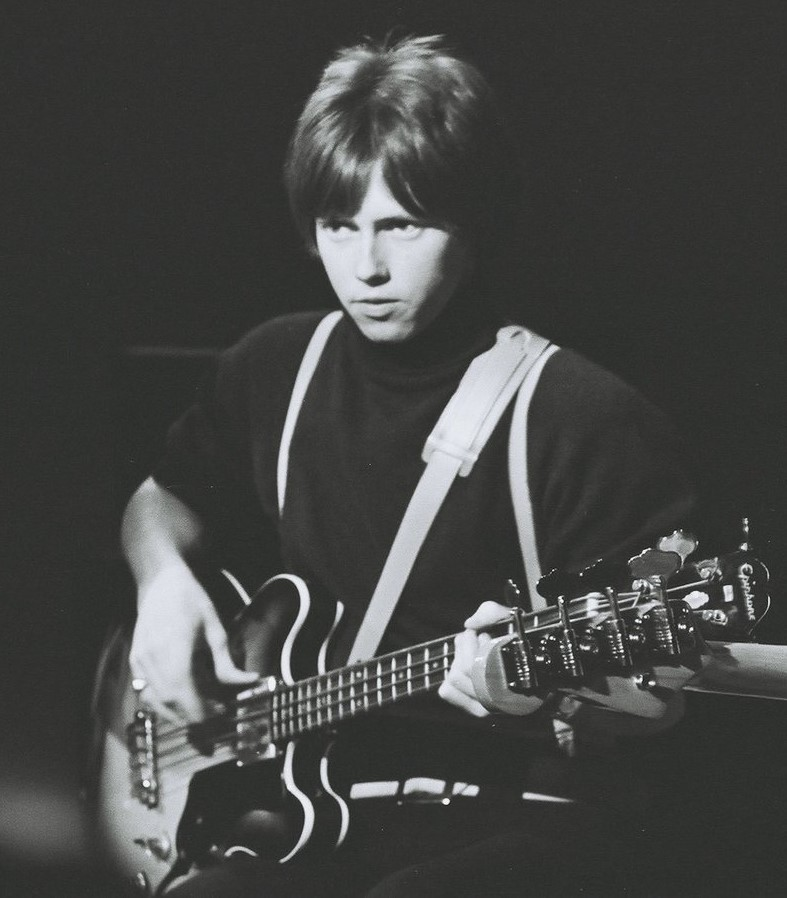
Göran Lagerberg

- Jean-Michel Labadie (Gojira)
- Abraham Laboriel (Garifuna)
- Göran Lagerberg (Tages, Kebnekajse)
- Greg Lake (King Crimson, Emerson, Lake & Palmer)
- Olli-Pekka Laine (Mannhai, Barren Earth, Amorphis)
- Joe Lally (Fugazi, Ataxia)
- Adrian Lambert (Biomechanical, DragonForce)
- Alan Lancaster (Status Quo)
- Dirk Lance (Incubus)
- Ronnie Lane (Small Faces, Faces)
- Steve Lang (April Wine, Mashmakhan)
- Conrad Lant (Venom)
- Chad Larson (The Aquabats)
- Dave LaRue (Dixie Dregs, Steve Morse Band)
- Bill Laswell
- Blackie Lawless (W.A.S.P., New York Dolls)
- Jack Lawrence (The Greenhornes, Blanche, The Raconteurs The Dead Weather)
- Steve Lawson
- Jim Lea (Slade)
- Michael League (Snarky Puppy)
- Frédéric Leclercq (Kreator)
- Bill Lee
- Brett Lee (Six & Out)
- Geddy Lee (Rush)
- Sara Lee (The B-52's, Gang of Four, Indigo Girls)
- Will Lee (The CBS Orchestra)
- Russell Leetch (Editors)
- Kelly LeMieux (Goldfinger)
- Paz Lenchantin (A Perfect Circle, Zwan, Pixies)
- Julian Lennon
- Martyn LeNoble (Thelonious Monster, Porno for Pyros, The Cult)
- Michael LePond (Symphony X)
- Phil Lesh (Grateful Dead) and now currently with Phil Lesh and Friends
- Stefan Lessard (Dave Matthews Band)
- John Levén (Europe, Brazen Abbot)
- Jim Leverton (Blodwyn Pig, Caravan, Fat Mattress)
- Tony Levin (King Crimson, John Lennon, Peter Gabriel, Paul Simon, Liquid Tension Experiment)
- Daniel Vee Lewis (World Entertainment War)
- Graham Lewis (Wire)
- Mike Lewis (Lostprophets)
- Tony Lewis (The Outfield)
- Steve "The Gangsta Rabbi" Lieberman
- Dan Lilker (Anthrax, Stormtroopers of Death, Nuclear Assault)
- Peter Lindgren (Opeth, Steel)
- Jenny Lee Lindberg (Warpaint)
- Brian Locking (The Shadows, Marty Wilde)
- John Lodge (The Moody Blues)
- Danny Lohner (Nine Inch Nails)
- Tony Lombardo (Descendents)
- James LoMenzo (Megadeth, Ozzy Osbourne, Black Label Society)
- Peter London (Crashdïet)
- Joe Long (The Four Seasons)
- Alan Longmuir (Bay City Rollers)
- Nick Lowe (Brinsley Schwarz, Rockpile)
- Conrad Lozano (Los Lobos)
- Doug Lubahn (The Doors)
- Matt Lukin (Melvins, Mudhoney)
- Bruce Lynch (Cat Stevens)
- Riker Lynch (R5 (band))
- Phil Lynott (Thin Lizzy)
- Ken Lyons (38 Special, The Lemonheads)

== M ==
- Graham Maby (Joe Jackson, They Might Be Giants, Natalie Merchant)
- Bill MacCormick (Matching Mole)
- Alick Macheso (Orchestra Mberikwazvo)
- Ian MacKaye (The Teen Idles)
- Steve Mackey (Pulp)
- Lawrie MacMillan (Stiltskin, Ray Wilson)
- Mickey Madden (Maroon 5)
- Matt Maginn (Cursive)
- Tony Maimone (Pere Ubu, They Might Be Giants)
- Natalie Maines (Dixie Chicks)
- Sean Malone (Cynic, Gordian Knot)
- Olivier Manchion (Ulan Bator, Permanent Fatal Error)
- Aimee Mann ('Til Tuesday)
- Michael Manring
- Brian Marshall (Creed, Alter Bridge)
- Ryan Martinie (Mudvayne)
- Nick Massi (The Four Seasons)
- Glen Matlock (Sex Pistols)
- Joe B. Mauldin (The Crickets)
- Jim Mayer (Coral Reefer Band)
- Ricky Maymi (The Brian Jonestown Massacre)
- Gerry McAvoy (Rory Gallagher)
- Christian McBride
- Paul McCartney (The Beatles, Wings)
- Jason McCaslin (Sum 41)
- Mark McClelland (Snow Patrol)
- Andy McCluskey (Orchestral Manoeuvres in the Dark)
- Doug McCombs (Tortoise, Eleventh Dream Day)
- Drew McConnell (Babyshambles)
- Tim McCord (Evanescence)
- Danny McCormack (The Wildhearts, The Yo-Yos)
- Jeremy McCoy
- Chris McCusker
- Hugh McDonald (Bon Jovi)
- Ron McGovney (Metallica)
- Paul 'Guigsy' McGuigan (Oasis)
- Tom McGuinness (Manfred Mann, McGuinness Flint)
- Duff McKagan (Guns N' Roses, Velvet Revolver, Loaded, Neurotic Outsiders, Fastbacks)
- Ben McKee (Imagine Dragons)
- Allen McKenzie (FireHouse)
- John McKenzie (Man, Eurythmics, Bob Dylan, The Pretenders)
- Ali McMordie (Stiff Little Fingers)
- John McVie (Fleetwood Mac)
- Randy Meisner (The Eagles, Poco)
- Justin Meldal-Johnsen (Beck)
- Nate Mendel (Sunny Day Real Estate, Foo Fighters)
- Martin Mendez (Opeth)
- Marco Mendoza (Thin Lizzy, Whitesnake)
- Mark Mendoza (Twisted Sister)
- Buwi Meneses (Parokya ni Edgar)
- Dave Meros (Spock's Beard)
- Bryn Merrick (The Damned)
- Robbie Merrill (Godsmack)
- Alan Merrill (The Arrows)
- Mike Merritt (Johnny Copeland)
- Johnny Lee Middleton (Savatage)
- Marcus Miller (Miles Davis, Grover Washington Jr., Bill Withers, Stuff, David Sanborn)
- Mike Mills (R.E.M.)
- Roger Miret (Agnostic Front, Madball)
- Roy Mitchell-Cárdenas (Mutemath)
- Naoshi Mizuta (The Star Onions)
- Gordon Moakes (Bloc Party)
- Thiago Modesto (Quimere)
- Ole Moe (Immortal, Aura Noir)
- A. J. Mogis (Criteria)
- Billy Mohler (Jimmy Chamberlin Complex, The Calling)
- John Mole (Colosseum II, Gary Moore)
- John Monte (M.O.D., Mind Funk, Ministry, Revolting Cocks, Human Waste Project)
- Monk Montgomery
- Craig Montoya (Everclear)
- Bob Moore (The Nashville A-Team)
- R. Stevie Moore
- Tom Morello (Street Sweeper Social Club)
- Patricia Morrison (The Gun Club, The Sisters of Mercy, The Damned)
- Sterling Morrison (The Velvet Underground)
- Rockette Morton (Captain Beefheart and The Magic Band, Mallard)
- Keith Moseley (The String Cheese Incident)
- Peter Mosely (Inspection 12, Yellowcard)
- Cordell Mosson (Parliament-Funkadelic)
- Robin Moulder (TCR, Jack Off Jill)
- Colin Moulding (XTC)
- Gary Mounfield aka Mani (The Stone Roses, Primal Scream)
- John Moyer (Disturbed)
- John Munson (Semisonic)
- Derrick Murdock (The Tonight Show with Jay Leno)
- William Murderface (Dethklok)
- Chris Murphy (Sloan)
- Dee Murray (Elton John)
- George Murray (David Bowie)
- Neil Murray (Black Sabbath, Michael Schenker Group, Whitesnake)
- John Myung (Dream Theater)

== N ==
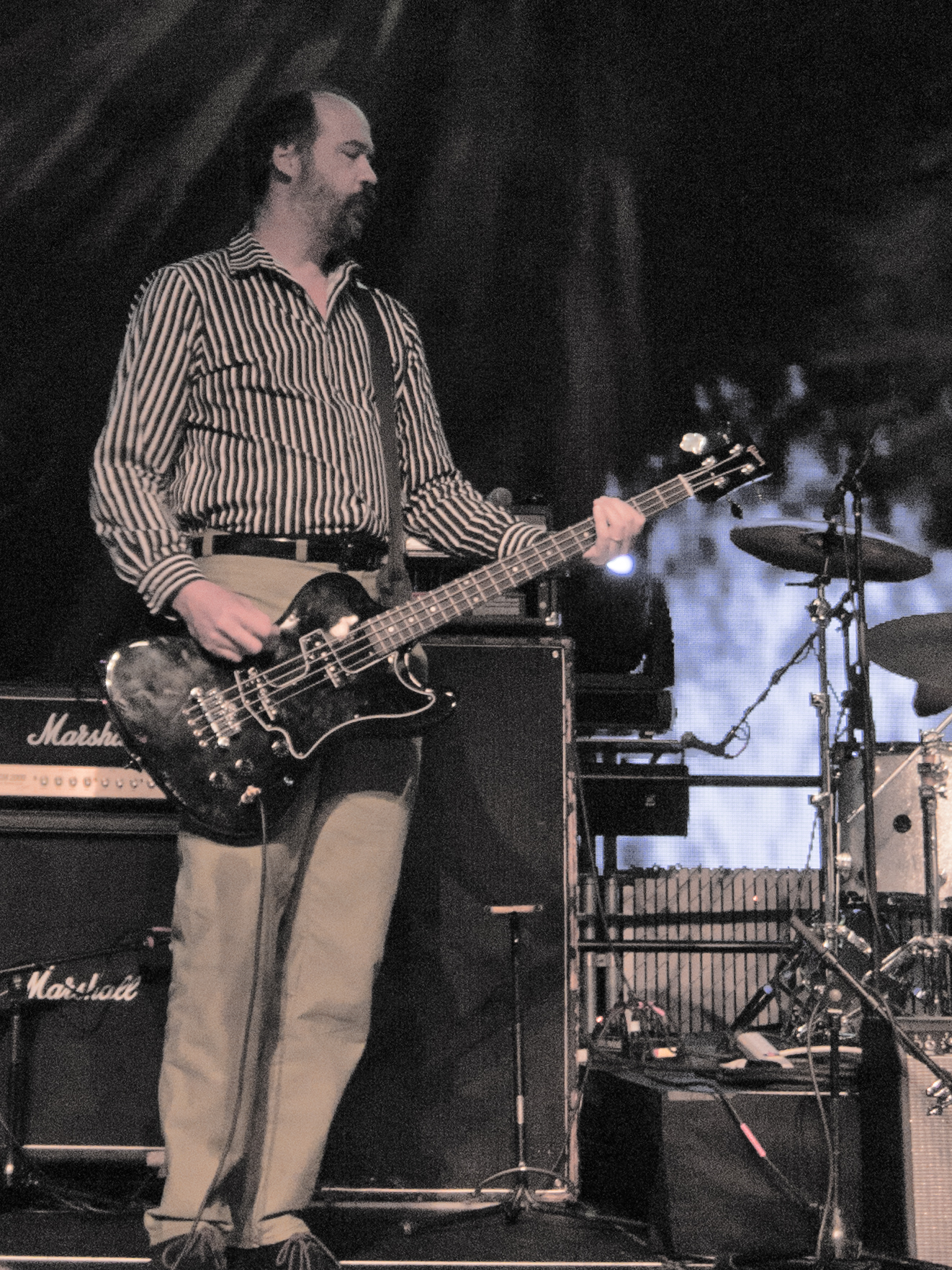
Krist Novoselic of Nirvana in 2011

- Johnette Napolitano (Concrete Blonde)
- Meshell Ndegeocello
- Necrobutcher (Mayhem)
- Kim Nekroman (Nekromantix)
- Billy Bass Nelson (Parliament-Funkadelic)
- Gabe Nelson (Cake)
- Ida Kristine Nielsen (Zap Mama, MLTR, 3rdeyegirl, The New Power Generation)
- Les Nemes (Haircut One Hundred)
- Jason Newsted (Flotsam and Jetsam, Voivod, Metallica, Echobrain, Rock Star Supernova, Ozzy Osbourne)
- Danielle Nicole (Trampled Under Foot)
- Rob "Blasko" Nicholson (Rob Zombie, Ozzy Osbourne)
- Kelly Nickels (L.A. Guns, Faster Pussycat)
- Johan Niemann (Therion, Demonoid)
- Greg Norton (Hüsker Dü)
- Matt Noveskey (Blue October)
- Krist Novoselic (Nirvana, Eyes Adrift)
- Jonathan Noyce (Jethro Tull)

== O ==
- Berry Oakley (The Allman Brothers Band)
- Marty O'Brien (We Are the Fallen)
- Brian "Big Hands" O'Conner (Eagles of Death Metal)
- Shavo Odadjian (System of a Down)
- Bernard Odum (James Brown)
- Tetsuya Ogawa (L'Arc-en-Ciel)
- Tomomi (musician) (Scandal (Japanese band))
- Patrick O'Hearn (Frank Zappa)
- Mike Oldfield
- Nick Oliveri (Kyuss, The Dwarves, Mondo Generator, Queens of the Stone Age)
- Stefan Olsdal (Placebo)
- Jerry Only (The Misfits)
- Cait O'Riordan (The Pogues)
- Benjamin Orr (The Cars)
- Jackie Orszaczky
- Joe Osborn (The Wrecking Crew, The Nashville A-Team)
- Franc O'Shea
- Mat Osman (Suede)
- Merrill Osmond (The Osmonds)
- Mark Owen (Take That)
- Scott Owen (The Living End)

== P ==
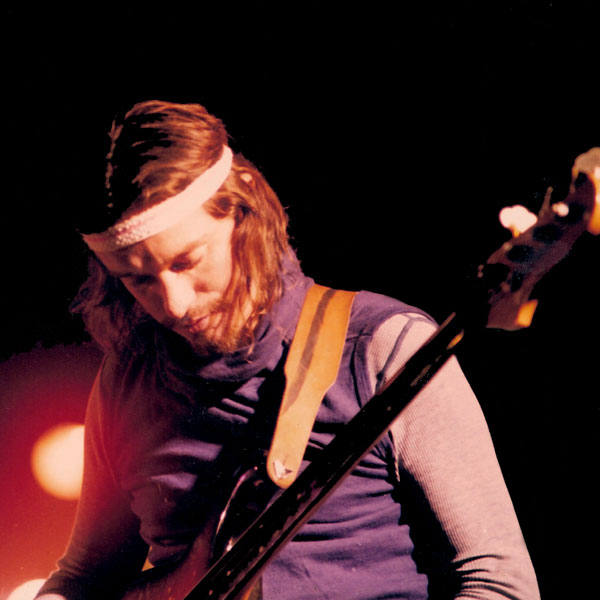
Jaco Pastorius

- Mikko Paananen (HIM)
- Sascha Paeth (Luca Turilli's Dreamquest)
- Richard Page (Mr. Mister)
- Alec Palao (The Sting-rays, The Sneetches, Mushroom)
- Pino Palladino (John Mayer Trio, The Who, Phil Collins, The Pussycat Dolls)
- Bruce Palmer (Buffalo Springfield)
- Del Palmer (Kate Bush)
- Chuck Panozzo (Styx)
- Horace Panter (The Specials, General Public)
- Felix Pappalardi (Mountain)
- Dave Parsons (Bush, The Partisans, Transvision Vamp)
- Kenny Passarelli (Barnstorm, Elton John)
- Jaco Pastorius (Pat Metheny, Weather Report, Joni Mitchell)
- John Patitucci (Chick Corea)
- David Paton (Pilot, The Alan Parsons Project)
- Roger Patterson (Atheist)
- Aaron Pauley (Of Mice & Men)
- Dougie Payne (Travis)
- Justin Pearson (The Locust, Some Girls, Head Wound City)
- Bojan Pečar (EKV)
- Mark Peddle
- Wayne Pedzwater (Buddy Rich, Michael Jackson, Blood, Sweat & Tears)
- Dave Pegg (Fairport Convention, Jethro Tull)
- Matt Pegg (Procol Harum)
- Wendy Penney (Bermuda Triangle Band)
- Jesse Peretz (The Lemonheads)
- George "Chocolate" Perry
- Tom Petersson (Cheap Trick)
- Tracy Pew (The Birthday Party)
- Mauro Pezzente (Godspeed You! Black Emperor)
- Kristen Pfaff (Janitor Joe, Hole)
- Jeff Pilson (Dokken, Foreigner)
- David Piltch (k.d. lang, Joe Henry, Holly Cole)
- Jeff Pinkus (Butthole Surfers)
- Doug Pinnick (King's X)
- Paulo Xisto Pinto Jr. (Sepultura)
- Brian Pittman (Relient K, Inhale Exhale)
- Morris Pleasure (Sideman, Earth, Wind & Fire)
- Pekka Pohjola (Wigwam)
- Ray Pohlman (The Wrecking Crew)
- Dave Pomeroy
- Lee Pomeroy (Jeff Lynne's ELO, Take That)
- Jim Pons (The Turtles, The Mothers of Invention)
- Jon Poole (Cardiacs, the Wildhearts, the Lotus Eaters, Panixphere, Dr Hook, Lifesigns)
- Catherine Popper (Ryan Adams & the Cardinals, Grace Potter and the Nocturnals)
- Robert "Pops" Popwell (The Crusaders, The Rascals)
- Mike Porcaro (Toto)
- Lauri Porra (Stratovarius)
- George Porter Jr. (The Meters)
- Tiran Porter (The Doobie Brothers)
- Nic Potter (Van der Graaf Generator)
- Frankie Poullain (The Darkness)
- John Power (The La's)
- Millard Powers (Majosha, Counting Crows)
- Dougie Poynter (McFly)
- Bondan Prakoso
- Guy Pratt (Pink Floyd, David Gilmour, Roxy Music)
- Pino Presti (Mina, Wilson Pickett, Shirley Bassey, Gerry Mulligan, Astor Piazzolla)
- Francis "Rocco" Prestia (Tower of Power)
- Joe Preston (Sunn O))), Thrones, High on Fire, Melvins)
- Rick Price (The Move, ELO, Wizzard)
- Steve Priest (Sweet)
- Prince
- Joe Principe (Rise Against)
- Joe Puerta (Ambrosia, Bruce Hornsby and the Range)
- Norbert Putnam (Muscle Shoals Rhythm Section, Area Code 615, Elvis Presley, The Nashville A-Team)
- Dave "Herr Pubis" Pybus (Cradle of Filth, Anathema)
- Howie Pyro (D Generation, Danzig)

== Q ==
- Pete Quaife (The Kinks)
- Suzi Quatro
- Nate Query (The Decemberists)
- Jesse Quin (Keane)
- Mick Quinn (Supergrass)

== R ==
- Carl Radle (Eric Clapton)
- Will Rahmer (Mortician)
- Chuck Rainey
- Twiggy Ramirez (Marilyn Manson, A Perfect Circle, Nine Inch Nails)
- C. J. Ramone (The Ramones)
- Dee Dee Ramone (The Ramones)
- Jimmie Randall (Jo Jo Gunne)
- Paul Raven (Killing Joke, Prong, Ministry)
- Brian Ray (Paul McCartney)
- Jozef Ráž (Elán)
- Noel Redding (The Jimi Hendrix Experience)
- Zoran Redžić (Bijelo Dugme)
- Scott Reeder (Kyuss, Unida)
- Greg Reeves
- Keanu Reeves (Dogstar)
- Tony Reeves (Colosseum, Greenslade)
- John Regan (Frehley's Comet)
- Julianne Regan (Gene Loves Jezebel)
- Jonas Renkse (Bloodbath)
- Trent Reznor (Nine Inch Nails)
- Michael Rhodes (The Notorious Cherry Bombs)
- Tim Rice-Oxley (Keane)
- John Rich (Lonestar)
- Jim Richardson (If)
- Matt Riddle (Face to Face)
- Greg Ridley (Humble Pie, Spooky Tooth)
- Oliver Riedel (Rammstein)
- Brian Ritchie (Violent Femmes)
- Tyson Ritter (The All American Rejects)
- Sam Rivers (Limp Bizkit)
- Tom Robinson (Tom Robinson Band)
- Johnny Rod (W.A.S.P., King Kobra)
- Steve Rodby (Pat Metheny)
- Jim Rodford (Argent, The Kinks)
- Omar Rodríguez-López (De Facto)
- Kira Roessler (Black Flag)
- Kenny Rogers (Kenny Rogers and The First Edition)
- Marc Rogers (The Philosopher Kings)
- Carmine Rojas (David Bowie, Rod Stewart, Joe Bonamassa)
- Rick Rosas (Neil Young, Etta James)
- Leaton Rose (The Hot Lies, I Killed the Prom Queen)
- Magnus Rosén (HammerFall)
- Lars Rosenberg (Carbonized, Entombed, Serpent)
- Chris Ross (Wolfmother)
- Share Ross (Vixen, Contraband)
- John Rostill (The Shadows)
- Andy Rourke (The Smiths)
- Demis Roussos (Aphrodite's Child)
- Divinity Roxx (Beyoncé, Alicia Keys, Mark Batson, B.o.B., Victor Wooten)
- Robb Royer (Bread)
- Ilan Rubin (The New Regime)
- Mike Rutherford (Genesis, Mike + The Mechanics)
- Kevin Rutmanis (Cows, Melvins, Tomahawk)
- Greg Rzab (Buddy Guy)

== S ==
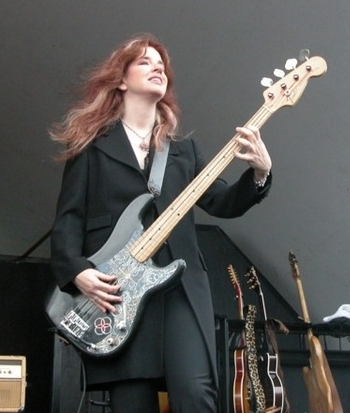
Michael Steele, formerly of the Bangles

- Igor Saavedra
- Jeanne Sagan (The Acacia Strain, All That Remains)
- Tetsuo Sakurai (Casiopea)
- Tobias Sammet (Edguy, Avantasia)
- Samoth (Thou Shalt Suffer, Satyricon, Gorgoroth & Zyklon-B)
- Calvin "Fuzzy" Samuel (CSNY, Manassas)
- Ian Samwell (The Drifters)
- Paul Samwell-Smith (The Yardbirds)
- Troy Sanders (Mastodon)
- Mark Sandman (Morphine)
- Max Santos (Aventura)
- Gabe Saporta (Midtown)
- Rudy Sarzo (Quiet Riot, Whitesnake, Ozzy Osbourne, Manic Eden, Dio)
- Louis Satterfield (Chess Records, Earth, Wind & Fire)
- John Baker Saunders (Mad Season)
- Brad Savage (Band from TV)
- Rick Savage (Def Leppard)
- Russ Savakus (Bob Dylan, Van Morrison)
- Taiji Sawada (X Japan)
- Patrick Scales (Klaus Doldinger, Pee Wee Ellis, Chuck Loeb)
- Tony Scalzo (Fastball)
- Mel Schacher (Grand Funk Railroad)
- Jason Scheff (Chicago)
- Jerry Scheff (Elvis Presley, The Doors, The Association)
- Richard Scheufler
- Don Schiff
- Dirk Schlächter (Gamma Ray)
- Adam Schlesinger (Fountains of Wayne, Ivy, Tinted Windows)
- Zander Schloss (The Circle Jerks, The Weirdos)
- Dan Schmid (Cherry Poppin' Daddies, The Visible Men, Black Francis)
- Timothy B. Schmit (Eagles, Poco)
- Dave Schulthise (Dead Milkmen)
- Dave Schools (Widespread Panic)
- Joseph "Lucky" Scott (Curtom Records)
- Derf Scratch (Fear)
- Karl E. H. Seigfried
- Anna Sentina
- Steve Severin (Siouxsie and the Banshees)
- Carlo Von Sexron (Queens of the Stone Age, Eagles of Death Metal, Mondo Generator, The Desert Sessions)
- Nick Seymour (Crowded House)
- Robbie Shakespeare (Sly and Robbie, The Revolutionaries, The Aggrovators, Compass Point All Stars)
- Tommy Shannon (Stevie Ray Vaughan, Johnny Winter, Storyville)
- Matt Sharp (Weezer, The Rentals)
- Kim Shattuck (Pixies)
- Snowy Shaw (Dimmu Borgir)
- Billy Sheehan (Niacin, Mr. Big, Steve Vai, David Lee Roth)
- Fran Sheehan (Boston)
- Ben Shepherd (Soundgarden)
- Jeff Sherman (Glass)
- Scott Shiflett (Face to Face, Viva Death, Jackson United)
- Natasha Shneider (Eleven)
- Scott Shriner (Weezer)
- Ray Shulman (Gentle Giant)
- Michael Shuman (Queens of the Stone Age)
- Azharlevi Sianturi (Kekal)
- Gene Simmons (Kiss)
- Jeff Simmons (The Mothers of Invention)
- Paul Simonon (The Clash, Havana 3am, The Good, the Bad & the Queen)
- David Wm. Sims (Scratch Acid, The Jesus Lizard)
- Richard Sinclair (Caravan)
- Ryan Sinn (Angels & Airwaves)
- Ken Sinnaeve (Streetheart, Tom Cochrane, Red Rider, Loverboy)
- Nikki Sixx (Mötley Crüe, Brides of Destruction, Sixx:A.M.)
- Muzz Skillings (Living Colour)
- Tim Skold (Marilyn Manson, KMFDM)
- Captain Sky
- Leland Sklar (Toto, The Section, Lyle Lovett, Jackson Browne, Phil Collins, Genesis, James Taylor)
- Spike Slawson (Swingin' Utters)
- Robert Sledge (Ben Folds Five)
- Jimmie Lee Sloas
- Phil Small (Cold Chisel)
- Derek Smalls (Spinal Tap)
- Curt Smith (Tears for Fears)
- Fred Smith (Blondie, Television)
- Jim Smith (Cardiacs)
- Kenn Smith
- Scott Smith (Loverboy)
- Zach Smith (Pinback)
- Bryce Soderberg (Lifehouse)
- Scott Sorry (Brides of Destruction, The Wildhearts)
- Ville Sorvali (Moonsorrow)
- Esperanza Spalding
- Phil Spalding (Toyah, GTR, Mike Oldfield)
- Joey Spampinato (NRBQ)
- Barry Sparks (Dokken)
- Mark Spicoluk (Avril Lavigne)
- Chris Squire (Yes)
- Adam Stanger (Comes with the Fall)
- Mike Starr (Alice in Chains)
- Doug Stegmeyer (Billy Joel)
- David Steele (The Beat, Fine Young Cannibals)
- Jeffrey Steele (Boy Howdy)
- Michael Steele (The Bangles)
- Peter Steele (Carnivore, Type O Negative)
- Lewie Steinberg (Booker T. & the M.G.'s)
- Sebastian Steinberg (Soul Coughing)
- Dan Stevens (Dead Milkmen)
- Tony Stevens (Foghat, Savoy Brown)
- T. M. Stevens (The Pretenders, The Headhunters)
- Brad Stewart (Fuel)
- Stephen Stills (Crosby, Stills, Nash & Young)
- Chris Stillwell (The Greyboy Allstars)
- Sting (The Police)
- Tommy Stinson (The Replacements, Guns N' Roses)
- Mark Stoermer (The Killers)
- Gary Stonadge (Big Audio Dynamite)
- Henry Strzelecki (The Nashville A-Team)
- Björn Strid (Terror 2000)
- Jesper Strömblad (Dimension Zero)
- Byron Stroud (Fear Factory, Strapping Young Lad, Zimmers Hole)
- Dana Strum (Slaughter, Vinnie Vincent Invasion)
- Hamish Stuart (Average White Band, Paul McCartney)
- Neil Stubenhaus (Barbra Streisand, Quincy Jones)
- Daryl Stuermer (Genesis)
- Kasim Sulton (Utopia, Meat Loaf, Joan Jett, The New Cars)
- Sumon
- Sunmi (Wonder Girls)
- Stuart Sutcliffe (The Beatles)
- Magnus Sveningsson (The Cardigans)
- Steve Swallow
- Dan Swanö (Pan.Thy.Monium)
- Leon Sylvers III (The Sylvers, Dynasty)

== T ==
- Jamaaladeen Tacuma
- Robby Takac (Goo Goo Dolls)
- Billy Talbot (Crazy Horse)
- Garry Tallent (E Street Band)
- Janis Tanaka (L7)
- John Taylor (Duran Duran, Power Station, Neurotic Outsiders)
- Larry Taylor (Canned Heat, The Monkees, Jerry Lee Lewis, John Mayall, Tom Waits)
- Kav Temperley (Eskimo Joe)
- Robert Tench (The Gass)
- Gary Thain (Keef Hartley, Uriah Heep)
- Jean-Yves Thériault (Voivod, Coeur Atomique)
- Jeroen Paul Thesseling (Obscura, Pestilence)
- Bruce Thomas (The Attractions)
- Fred Thomas (James Brown)
- Danny Thompson (Pentangle, Richard Thompson)
- Dougie Thomson (Supertramp)
- Phil Thornalley (The Cure, Johnny Hates Jazz)
- Scott Thunes (Frank Zappa, The Waterboys, Andy Prieboy, Fear, Steve Vai)
- Gary Tibbs (Roxy Music, Adam and the Ants, Hazel O'Connor)
- Michael Todd (Coheed and Cambria)
- Peter Tork (The Monkees)
- Devin Townsend (Bent Sea)
- Sisely Treasure (Shiny Toy Guns)
- Iracema Trevisan (Cansei de Ser Sexy)
- Pete Trewavas (Marillion)
- Derrick Tribbett (Dope)
- Robert Trujillo (Infectious Grooves, Suicidal Tendencies, Black Label Society, Ozzy Osbourne, Metallica)
- S. J. Tucker
- Fred Turner (Bachman–Turner Overdrive)
- Martin Turner (Wishbone Ash)

== U ==
- Takeshi Ueda (The Mad Capsule Markets)
- Chad Urmston (Dispatch)

== V ==
- Kathy Valentine (The Go-Go's)
- Ross Valory (Journey, Steve Miller Band)
- Eddie Van Halen (Van Halen, Sammy Hagar)
- Wolfgang Van Halen (Van Halen. Mammoth WVH)
- Larry Van Kriedt (AC/DC)
- Sami Vänskä (Nightwish)
- Gerald Veasley
- Jayen Varma
- Ken Vasoli (The Starting Line)
- Sergio Vega (Deftones)
- Morten Veland (Sirenia)
- D.D. Verni (Overkill)
- Sid Vicious (Sex Pistols)
- Varg "Count Grishnackh" Vikernes (Burzum, Mayhem)
- Rico Villasenor (downset.)
- David Vincent (Morbid Angel)
- Phil Volk (Paul Revere & the Raiders)
- Eerie Von (Samhain, Danzig)
- Klaus Voormann (Manfred Mann, Plastic Ono Band)
- ICS Vortex (Dimmu Borgir)

== W ==
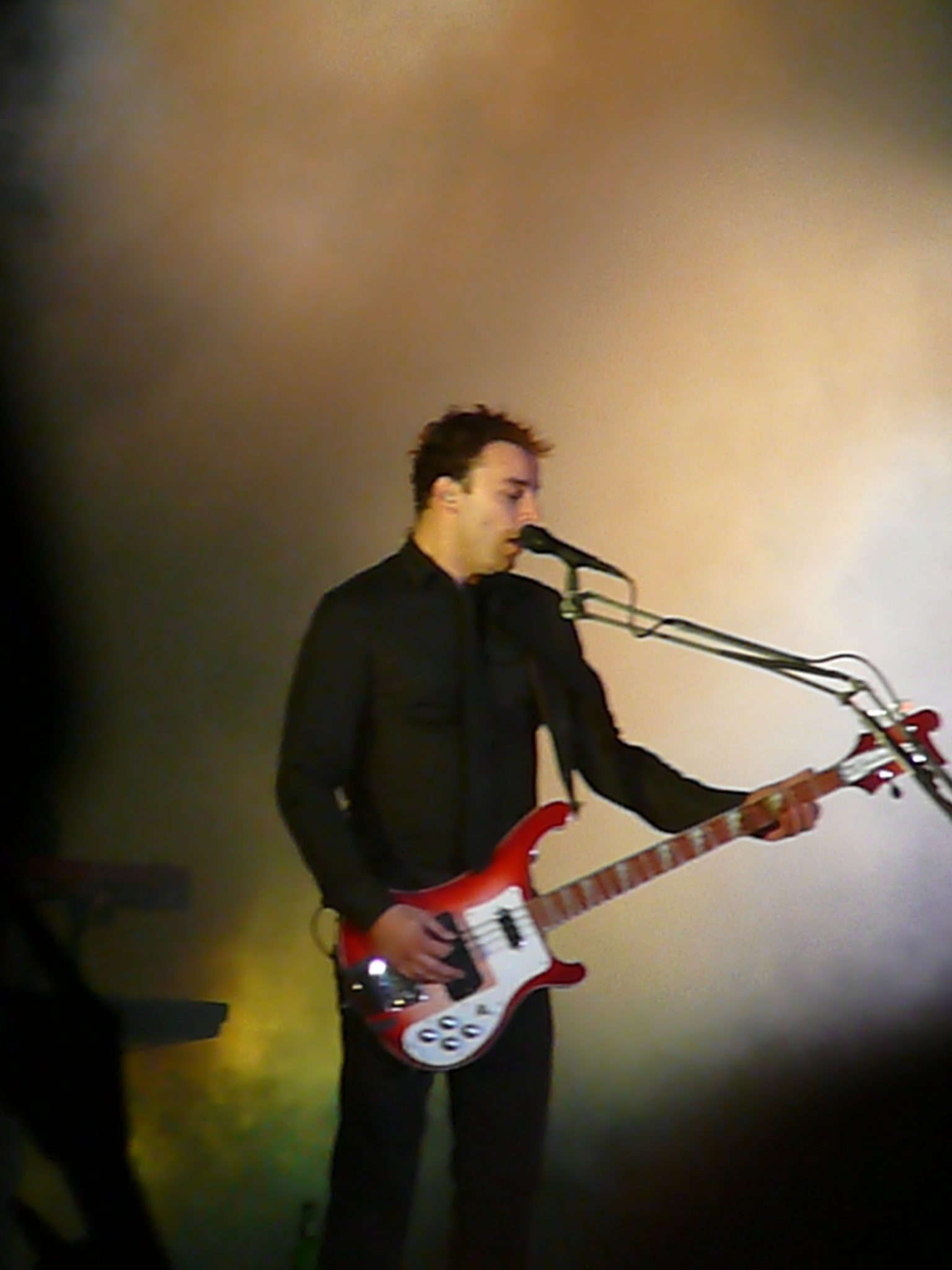
Chris Wolstenholme in 2007

- Matt Wachter (Thirty Seconds to Mars, Angels & Airwaves)
- Greg T. Walker (Lynyrd Skynyrd, Blackfoot)
- Johnny "Big Moose" Walker
- Jon Walker (Panic! at the Disco, The Young Veins)
- Scott Walker (The Walker Brothers)
- Algy Ward (The Damned)
- Dennis Ward (Pink Cream 69)
- Tim Ward (The Fall of Troy)
- John Warne (Relient K, Guerilla Rodeo)
- Andy Warren (The Monochrome Set)
- Jared Warren (Karp, Big Business, Melvins)
- Clint Warwick (The Moody Blues)
- Don Was (Was (Not Was), The B-52's, Bob Dylan, The Rolling Stones)
- Freddie Washington (Patrice Rushen), (Steely Dan)
- Roger Waters (Pink Floyd)
- Frank Watkins (Gorgoroth)
- Mike Watt (The Minutemen, Firehose, The Stooges)
- Norman Watt-Roy (The Blockheads)
- Nathan Watts (Stevie Wonder)
- Peter Watts (Mott the Hoople)
- Mikey Way (My Chemical Romance, Electric Century)
- Paul Webb (Talk Talk, .O.rang)
- Alex Webster (Cannibal Corpse)
- Dallon Weekes (Panic! at the Disco, The Brobecks, I Dont Know How but They Found Me)
- Willie Weeks (Stevie Wonder, George Harrison, Eric Clapton, David Bowie, Donny Hathaway, Vince Gill, Wynonna Judd)
- Danny Weinkauf (They Might Be Giants)
- Andrew Weiss (Ween, Gone, Rollins Band, Regressive Aid)
- Jair-Rôhm Parker Wells (Machine Gun)
- Mikey Welsh (Weezer)
- Pete Wentz (Fall Out Boy)
- Wess
- Bob Weston (Shellac)
- John Wetton (King Crimson, UK, Asia)
- Tina Weymouth (Talking Heads, Tom Tom Club)
- Ken Whaley (Help Yourself, Ducks Deluxe, Man}
- Chris White (The Zombies)
- Verdine White (Earth, Wind & Fire)
- Nick Wiggins (Aiden)
- Tal Wilkenfeld (Jeff Beck, Keith Urban, Jackson Browne, Toto)
- Leon Wilkeson (Lynyrd Skynyrd)
- Cliff Williams (AC/DC)
- Hank Williams III (Superjoint Ritual)
- Lamar Williams (The Allman Brothers Band)
- Leo Williams (Big Audio Dynamite, Dreadzone, Carbon/Silicon)
- Edgar Willis (Ray Charles)
- Gary Willis (Tribal Tech)
- Matt Willis (Busted)
- Brian Wilson (The Beach Boys)
- Eric Wilson (Sublime, Sublime with Rome, Long Beach Dub Allstars)
- Liam Wilson (The Dillinger Escape Plan)
- Mark Wilson (Jet)
- Paul Wilson (Snow Patrol)
- Doug Wimbish (The Sugarhill Gang, Living Colour, Tackhead, Mick Jagger, Joe Satriani)
- Kip Winger (Alice Cooper, Winger)
- Muff Winwood (The Spencer Davis Group)
- Steve Winwood (The Spencer Davis Group, Traffic, Go, Blind Faith)
- Nicky Wire (Manic Street Preachers)
- Jason Wisdom (Becoming the Archetype)
- Jah Wobble (Public Image Ltd)
- Anka Wolbert (Clan of Xymox/Xymox)
- Tom "T-Bone" Wolk (Hall & Oates, Billy Joel, Carly Simon)
- Chris Wolstenholme (Muse)
- Harry Womack (The Valentinos, Bobby Womack)
- Steve Wong (Beyond)
- Chris Wood (Medeski Martin & Wood)
- Stuart Wood (Bay City Rollers)
- Allen Woody (The Allman Brothers Band, Gov't Mule)
- Victor Wooten (Béla Fleck and the Flecktones, Bass Extremes, Vital Tech Tones)
- Glenn Worf (Mark Knopfler)
- D'arcy Wretzky (The Smashing Pumpkins)
- Chuck Wright (Giuffria, Quiet Riot, House of Lords)
- Rob Wright (Nomeansno)
- Tomasz "Orion" Wróblewski (Behemoth)
- Bill Wyman (The Rolling Stones)

== Y ==
- Sami Yaffa (Hanoi Rocks, New York Dolls, Murphy's Law)
- Brian Yale (Matchbox Twenty)
- Takahiro Yamada (Asian Kung-Fu Generation)
- Hiro Yamamoto (Soundgarden, Truly)
- Tetsu Yamauchi (Free, Faces)
- Adam Yauch (Beastie Boys)
- Jennifer York (Rachel Rachel)
- Thom Yorke (Radiohead, Atoms for Peace)
- Jasmine You (Versailles)
- Young K (Day6)
- Sean Yseult (White Zombie)
- Doug Yule (The Velvet Underground)

== Z ==
- Buddy Zabala (Eraserheads, The Dawn, Cambio, Moonstar88)
- Stuart Zender (Jamiroquai)
- Regina Zernay (Cowboy Mouth)

== See also ==
- List of classical guitarists
- List of drummers
- List of jazz guitarists
- List of lead guitarists
- List of rhythm guitarists
- List of slide guitarists
- List of keyboardists
