= List of slap bass players (electric bass) =

This is a list of bassists known for their slap bass technique.

== A ==
- Dave Allen (Shriekback)
- Mark Adams (Slave)
- George Anderson (Shakatak)
- Emma Anzai (Sick Puppies)
- Tomohito Aoki (solo artist, Toshiki Kadomatsu and others)
- Eugene Abdukhanov (Jinjer)
- Tom Araya (Slayer)
- John Avila (Oingo Boingo)

== B ==
- Chris Baio (Vampire Weekend)
- Davie504 (Real name Davide Biale, Solo Artist and YouTuber)
- Nick Beggs (Kajagoogoo)
- Jeff Berlin (solo artist, Bill Bruford)
- Cliff Burton (Metallica)
- Brian Bromberg (solo artist)
- Charles Berthoud (Solo Artist and YouTube)
- Joe Baker (solo artist)

== C ==
- Alain Caron (solo artist, Uzeb)
- Tony Choy (Atheist, Pestilence, Cynic)
- Johnny Christ (Avenged Sevenfold)
- Tim Commerford (Rage Against the Machine)
- Lynn Copeland (Big Mountain)
- Stanley Clarke (solo artist, Return to Forever, Chick Corea)
- Les Claypool (solo artist, Oysterhead, Primus)
- Bootsy Collins (solo artist, Bootsy's Rubber Band, Funkadelic, Parliament, Praxis)

== D ==
- Glen Diani (One Minute Silence)
- Luke DiSalvo (Jive Machine)
- Trevor Dunn (Mr. Bungle, Fantômas, Secret Chiefs 3, Trevor Dunn's Trio-Convulsant, David Krakauer)

== E ==
- Nathan East (Eric Clapton, Phil Collins, Fourplay)
- Bernard Edwards (Chic, Sister Sledge, Diana Ross, Power Station)
- David Ellefson (Megadeth)

== F ==
- Nick Fyffe (Jamiroquai), (David Jordan)
- John Norwood Fisher (Fishbone)
- Lex Feltham (Frenzal Rhomb)
- Fieldy (Korn)
- Flea (Red Hot Chili Peppers)
- Derek Forbes (Simple Minds and Propaganda)

== G ==
- Marshall Grant (Johnny Cash and The Tennessee Three)
- Leigh Gorman (Bow Wow Wow)
- Larry Graham (Sly and the Family Stone, Graham Central Station, Prince)
- Mike Gordon (Phish)
- Billy Gould (Faith No More)

== H ==
- Stu Hamm (solo artist, Steve Vai, Joe Satriani and others)
- Milt Hinton (Cab Calloway and others)
- Jeph Howard (The Used)

== J ==
- Louis Johnson (The Brothers Johnson, Quincy Jones, Michael Jackson, George Duke)
- John Paul Jones (Led Zeppelin, Them Crooked Vultures)

== K ==
- Mark King (Level 42)
- Tony Kanal (No Doubt)
- Khaled 'Bassbaba' Sumon (Aurthohin)

== L ==
- Eric Langlois (Cryptopsy)
- Terry Lewis (The Time)
- Dirk Lance (Formerly in Incubus)
- Dave LaRue (Dixie Dregs, Steve Morse Band and others)
- Martyn LeNoble (Porno For Pyros)
- Henrik Linder (Dirty Loops)
- Trevor Lindsey (Aaron Neville)
- Russell Lock (Multi-Instrumental Virtuoso)
- Abraham Laboriel (Friendship, Koinonia)

== M ==
- Martin Mendez (Opeth)
- Marcus Miller (solo artist, Miles Davis, David Sanborn, Luther Vandross)
- Ryan Martinie (Mudvayne, Soften The Glare)
- Arif Mirabdolbaghi (Protest The Hero)

== N ==
- Meshell Ndegeocello
- Jason Newsted (Metallica)

== P ==
- Guy Pratt (The Orb, Pink Floyd, David Gilmour)
- Jorge Pescara (solo artist, Ithamara Koorax, Dom Um Romao, Eumir Deodato, Luis Bonfa)
- Dave Pomeroy
- Mike Percy (Dead Or Alive (band))

== R ==
- Rayna Foss-Rose (Coal Chamber)

== S ==
- Saidus Salehin Khaled (Bassbaba Sumon)
- Mitsuru Sutoh (T-Square)
- Tetsuo Sakurai (Casiopea, Jimsaku, solo artist)
- Muzz Skillings (Living Colour)
- Chris Squire (Yes)
- T. M. Stevens (Solo Artist, The Headhunters, Victor Wooten, Steve Vai, James Brown, Billy Joel, Tina Turner, Joe Cocker)

== T ==
- John Taylor (Duran Duran)
- Robert Trujillo (Metallica, Suicidal Tendencies, Ozzy Osbourne, Black Label Society)
- Toshiya (Dir En Grey)
- Taneda Takeshi (Crush 40)
- Mic Todd (Coheed and Cambria)

== U ==
- Futoshi Uehara (Maximum The Hormone)

== V ==
- Jayen Varma

== W ==
- Jimbo Wallace (The Reverend Horton Heat)
- Mike Watt (Minutemen)
- Mark White (Spin Doctors)
- Eric Wilson (Sublime)
- Doug Wimbish (Sugarhill Gang, Grandmaster Flash, Living Colour, Mick Jagger)
- Chris Wolstenholme (Muse)
- Victor Wooten (solo artist, Béla Fleck and the Flecktones, SMV)
- Amos Williams (TesseracT)
- Mark Weber Average White Band
- Aaron Wills (AKA Pnut) 311

== Y ==
- Yoshihiro Naruse (Casiopea)

== Z ==
- Stuart Zender (Formerly in Jamiroquai)

== See also ==
- List of slap bass players (double bass)
