= Bretel =

Bretel is a surname. Notable people with the surname include:

- Andrés Bretel (born 24 June 1978), Peruvian musician and record producer
- Jacques Bretel (13th century), French trouvère (troubadour)
- Jehan Bretel (c.1210–1272), French trouvère (troubadour)

== See also ==
- Brettell
