= Panshikar =

Panshikar is a surname. Notable people with the surname include:

- Aparna Panshikar, Hindustani classical vocalist
- Prabhakar Panshikar (1931–2011), Indian actor
- Raghunandan Panshikar (born 1963), Hindustani classical vocalist, son of Prabhakar
