= Brettell =

Brettell is a surname. Notable people with the surname include:

- Caroline Brettell (born 1950), American cultural anthropologist
- David Brettell (born 1956), English cricketer
- Frank Brettell (1862–1936), English-born Irish football player, manager and administrator
- Gordon Brettell (1915–1944), British Royal Air Force pilot and prisoner of war, murdered during the "Great Escape"
- Jacob Brettell (1793–1862), English unitarian minister

== See also ==
- Bretel
