= Bass Musician =

American trade magazine

- executive editor: Raul Amador
- Categories: Music magazine
- Frequency: Monthly
- First issue: August 2007
- Company: Venus Imaging Education, LLC
- Country: United States
- Based in: Vancouver, Washington, U.S.
- Language: English
- Website: bassmusicianmagazine.com

Bass Musician is a monthly, free online publication published in Vancouver, Washington, for bass musicians and industry professionals. The magazine was founded in 2007, headed by Raul Amador (Executive Editor) and Valery Amador (News Editor). The magazine was first published in August/September 2007.

Each issue includes interviews with prominent bassists, album and book reviews, gear reviews, industry updates, and contributions from writers worldwide, such as Ric Fierabracci, Alain Caron, Al Caldwell, Bill Dickens, Damian Erskine, Jayen Varma, Todd Johnson, Vail Johnson, Michael Manring, Mike Pope, Igor Saavedra, Kenn Smith, Gary Willis, Suzy Starlite and Yves Carbonne.

Streaming video of performances and gear reviews are an integral part of the magazine's format. The magazine has featured cover interviews with Anthony Jackson, Ron Carter, Larry Graham, Victor Wooten, Marcus Miller, Nathan East, Hutch Hutchinson, Les Claypool, Nathan Watts, Eddie Gómez, and Jeff Berlin while showcasing newer talents like Grammy Award winner Esperanza Spalding.
