= List of slap bass players (double bass) =

This is a list of double bassists known for their slap bass technique.

- Bill Black
- Wellman Braud
- Steve Brown (bass player)
- Dorsey Burnette
- Ray Campi
- Willie Dixon
- Pops Foster
- Milt Hinton
- William Manuel Johnson
- Geoff Kresge
- Marshall Lytle
- Kim Nekroman
- Scott Owen
- Lee Rocker
- Djordje Stijepovic
- Jimbo Wallace

== See also ==
- List of slap bass players (electric bass)
