= Círculos =

Studio album by Madre Matilda
- Released: 2000
- Recorded: El Techo
- Genre: Pop punk
- Label: Sony Music - Columbia
- Producer: Jorge "Pelo" Madueño

Madre Matilda chronology
Madre Matilda (1969)	Círculos (2000)

Círculos (Spanish for "circles") is Madre Matilda's second and last album. It was produced by Jorge "Pelo" Madueño and released under the Sony Music - Columbia Label. A video clip was released for the "Círculos" track.

== Track listing ==
1. "Círculos" – 3:43
2. "Sin llorar" – 4:34
3. "Entre tus brazos" – 3:20
4. "Manos blancas" – 3:36
5. "De cabeza" – 3:24
6. "Regresa" – 5:30
7. "En soledad" – 3:53
8. "Tragando el polvo" – 3:38
9. "Deja de llorar" – 2:56
10. "Las hadas" – 4:37
11. "Si fuera" – 4:12
12. "Reflejada" – 3:02

== Personnel ==
- Pierina Less: Vocals
- Carlos Salas: Guitar
- Vitucho Malasquez: Bass guitar
- Jorge Olazo: Drums
- Producer: Jorge "Pelo" Madueño,
- Guest Musicians: Pelo Madueño (bass tracks 3 and 6), Vitucho Malasquez (bass, tracks 9 and 10), J. Madueño (bajo 4,5 y 8), Claudio Quiñónes (programming).
- Arrangements: Pelo and Madre Matilda.
- Art, photograph, and video director: Mauricio Muñoz.
- Photography: María Lourdes Rodríguez
- Music and lyrics: Carlos Salas and Pierina Less, except for "Regresa" by Augusto Polo Campos.

== Recording ==
The album was recorded at Estudios Tu Puta Madre, El Techo. It was mixed in Garage Produce (Chile) and mastered in Garage Produce by Claudio Quiñónes.
