= The Blood of Gods =

Studio album by Gwar
- Released: October 20, 2017
- Studios: White Star Sound, Zion Crossroads, Virginia; Slave Pit Studios, Richmond, Virginia
- Genres: Thrash metal, heavy metal
- Length: 55:50
- Label: Metal Blade
- Producer: Ronan Chris Murphy

Gwar chronology
Battle Maximus (2013)	The Blood of Gods (2017)	The New Dark Ages (2022)

The Blood of Gods is the fourteenth studio album by American heavy metal band Gwar. It was released on October 20, 2017 by Metal Blade Records. It is the band's first album without founding member Dave Brockie, who portrayed Oderus Urungus, due to his heroin overdose death on March 23, 2014. The album is also the first to feature Michael Bishop since 1999's We Kill Everything, portraying the newest character, lead singer Blöthar the Berserker, as opposed to his role as the original Beefcake the Mighty. It is the band's last album to feature Jamison Land as Beefcake before his departure in 2019 as well as the last to be released through Metal Blade.

Professional ratings
Review scores
Source	Rating
MetalSucks	3.5/5 stars

== Overview ==
During their set on the first day of the 2017 Vans Warped Tour, the band debuted "Fuck This Place", a tribute to Oderus Urungus.

== Track listing ==
No.	Title	Length
1.	"War on Gwar"	7:21
2.	"Viking Death Machine"	4:15
3.	"El Presidente" (vocals by Blöthar the Berserker, Beefcake the Mighty, Jizmak Da Gusha, Balsac the Jaws of Death, and Pustulus Maximus)	4:21
4.	"I'll Be Your Monster"	3:09
5.	"Auroch"	4:05
6.	"Swarm"	4:33
7.	"The Sordid Soliloquy of Sawborg Destructo" (vocals by Sawborg Destructo)	4:07
8.	"Death to Dickie Duncan" (featuring MC Chris)	3:39
9.	"Crushed By the Cross" (vocals by Pustulus Maximus)	3:57
10.	"Fuck This Place"	5:08
11.	"Phantom Limb"	6:10
12.	"If You Want Blood (You Got It)" (AC/DC cover)	5:05
Total length:		55:50

- "Fuck This Place" contains an unlisted orchestral reprise of "War on Gwar" after the main song concludes. Vinyl pressings of the album feature a re-ordered track listing and place the reprise at the end of side C, following "Crushed By the Cross."

== Personnel ==
- Mike Bishop (Blöthar the Berserker) – lead vocals, bass on "Viking Death Machine" and "Crushed By the Cross"
- Brent Purgason (Pustulus Maximus) – lead guitar, backing vocals, lead vocals on "Crushed By the Cross", additional vocals on "El Presidente" and "Death to Dickie Duncan"
- Mike Derks (Balsac the Jaws of Death) – rhythm guitar, backing vocals, additional vocals on "El Presidente"
- Jamison Land (Beefcake the Mighty) – bass, backing vocals, additional vocals on "El Presidente" and "Fuck This Place", glockenspiel
- Brad Roberts (Jizmak Da Gusha) – drums, percussion, additional vocals on "El Presidente" and "Fuck This Place"
- Matt Maguire (Sawborg Destructo) – lead vocals on "The Sordid Soliloquy of Sawborg Destructo"
- Bob Gorman (Bonesnapper) – spoken words at the end of "If You Want Blood"
- MC Chris (Dickie Duncan) – additional vocals on "Death to Dickie Duncan" and "Fuck This Place"
- Jenna Ottinger – additional vocals on "War on Gwar" and "Crushed By the Cross"
- JW Adkins – orchestral arrangement on "War on Gwar" reprise
- Danny T. Levin – all horns and horn arrangements on "El Presidente"
- Jonah Kane-West – B3 organ on "Viking Death Machine", "I'll Be Your Monster", and "Phantom Limb"
- Nicole Roberts – additional percussion, tambourine, vibraslap, and Tibetan chimes
- Mark Kilborn – additional sound design
- Ronan Chris Murphy – production, keyboards, additional percussion, and backing vocals

== Charts ==
Chart (2017)	Peak position
US Independent Albums (Billboard)	12
US Top Hard Rock Albums (Billboard)	13
US Top Rock Albums (Billboard)	45
