= Jean Davoisne =

French drummer and composer

Jean Davoisne is a French drummer and composer.

== Career ==
Davoisne began his career as a drums teacher, bandmaster/conductor in music schools which helped him to begin two Tama drums schools in 2008 in southern France. He started performing at the age of 16 and did his very first project named Ultimatum in 1995, the band performed grunge/punk rock at the JMF his first step on stage. He has shared stages as drummer in several bands with various artists such as Emir Kusturica, Pleymo, Koritni, Jayen Varma, Aparna Panshikar, Angie Swan, Divinity Roxx, Noisia, Amon Tobin, DJ Miss Roxx, Billy ze Kick, Dr. Feelgood, John Coghlan's Quo. He performed later with the bands IPhaze and The Khayal Groove and has toured Canada, Europe and India. Davoisne is a versatile drummer, performing rock, metal, world music, drum and bass, dubstep and neurofunk.

== Recordings ==
Davoisne has released/co-produced four albums and four EPs. The main ones are The Other Side (album) with the Band Alkimya in 2007, distributed by Brennus Music in 35 countries, Reflections of a Purple Moon (album) in 2012 and Friendship (EP) in 2015 with the band The Khayal Groove. He has also been featured on more than 10 albums as drummer/composer with various French and foreign artists. In 2013, he was featured on the album Eternity by Tina Guo, he composed the original sound track for the French short movie, Le fantôme de Laurely, produced by Vis-Or Production and recorded "The Awakening", an original drums piece for the compilation Pulsa'son #3 produced by Eric Thievon. In 2016, he recorded Conn3ction (a live album) with the band Iphaze.

== Equipment ==
Davoisne endorses Tama Drums, Zildjian cymbals, Gruv Gear and Pro Orca products
