= The New Dark Ages =

Studio album by Gwar
- Released: June 3, 2022
- Genre: Heavy metal
- Length: 66:30
- Language: English
- Label: Slave Pit Inc.
- Producer: Ronan Murphy

Gwar chronology
The Blood of Gods (2017)	The New Dark Ages (2022)

"This is the greatest rock record of all time. These are the songs for a new age, a New Dark Age, when men live by the dimming light of a technology destined to betray them. Listen, as we have a rock and roll orgy in the ruins of the world to celebrate humanity’s descent into an age of darkness, disease, ignorance, and death."

— Blöthar the Berserker on the significance of this album and Gwar's mission.

The New Dark Ages is the fifteenth studio album by American heavy metal band Gwar. It was released on June 3, 2022 through the band's own label Slave Pit Inc., making it their first record to not be released through Metal Blade Records since Beyond Hell in 2006. It also marked the band's first album to feature bassist Casey Orr since Bloody Pit of Horror and the last album to feature guitarist Pustulus Maximus (Brent Purgason) before his departure from the band in 2023.

Since its release, the album has received positive reviews for the social commentary featured on its lyrics and Michael Bishop's vocal performance. It was promoted by a tour and the comic book Gwar in the Duoverse of Absurdity released by Z2 Comics.

== Reception ==
Sam Law of Kerrang! rated this album a 3 out of 5, stating that "rather than dulling the overall mood, the focus on seriousness in some parts emphasises the silliness of others" and declaring that Gwar "remain the sickest band in the universe". Writing for Metal Injection, Max Heilman gave this album an 8 out of 10, praising it for the band's social commentary and new vocalist Michael Bishop.

== Track listing ==
No.	Title	Length
1.	"New Dark Age"	4:17
2.	"Blood Libel"	3:36
3.	"Berserker Mode"	4:08
4.	"Mother Fucking Liar"	3:12
5.	"Unto the Breach"	4:19
6.	"Completely Fucked"	3:55
7.	"The Cutter" (featuring Lzzy Hale)	4:01
8.	"Rise Again" (featuring Hey Steve)	5:18
9.	"The Beast Will Eat Itself"	3:13
10.	"Venom of the Platypus"	4:36
11.	"Ratcatcher" (featuring "Divebar" Steve Kramer)	4:08
12.	"Bored to Death"	4:00
13.	"Temple Ascent (Death Whistle Suite)"	1:43
14.	"Starving Gods (Death Whistle Suite)"	5:11
15.	"Deus Ex Monstrum (Death Whistle Suite)"	10:53
Total length:		66:30

== Personnel ==
Gwar

- Michael Bishop (Blöthar the Berserker) – lead vocals, bass
- Bob Gorman (Bonesnapper the Cave Troll) – backing vocals
- Matt Maguire (Sawborg Destructo) – co-lead vocals
- Brent Purgason (Pustulus Maximus) – lead guitar, backing vocals
- Mike Derks (Bälsäc the Jaws o’ Death) – rhythm guitar, electric ukulele
- Casey Orr (Beefcake the Mighty) – bass, kazoo, backing vocals
- Brad Roberts (Jizmak Da Gusha) – drums, percussion

Additional personnel

- Alex De Jong – assistant engineering
- Lzzy Hale – vocals on "The Cutter"
- Hey Steve – rapping on "Rise Again"
- Alex Horley – cover art
- "Divebar" Steve Kramer – harmony vocals on "Ratcatcher"
- Ronan Murphy – keyboards, vocals, sound design, mixing, production, mastering
- Arlan Oscar – Hammond B3 on "Rise Again", Mellotron on "Rise Again"

== See also ==
- 2022 in American music
- Lists of 2022 albums
