= Michael Bishop (bassist) =

American rock musician

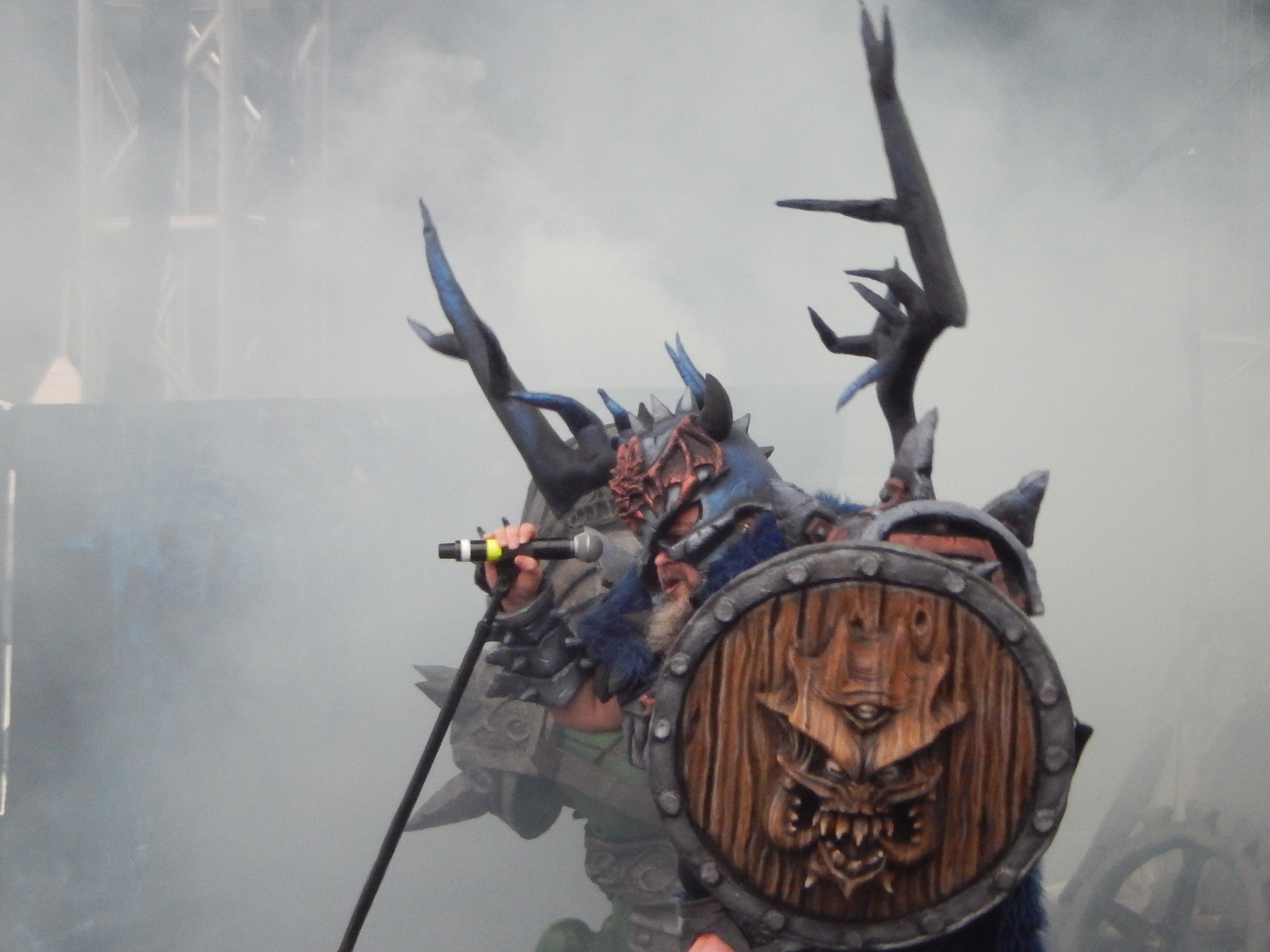
- Bishop as Blothar in 2014

Background information
- Also known as: Beefcake the Mighty; Blothar the Berserker
- Born: September 7, 1968 (age 57); Honolulu, Hawaii, U.S.
- Genres: Hard rock, shock rock, heavy metal, punk
- Occupation: Musician
- Instruments: Vocals, bass
- Years active: 1984–present
- Member of: Gwar
- Formerly of: Kepone
- Website: gwar.net

Michael Bryan "Mike" Bishop (born September 7, 1968) is an American bassist and vocalist and a member of the heavy metal band Gwar.

== Life and career ==
He attended Thomas Dale High School in Chester, Virginia. Most notably, he was the bass guitarist and, after a 20-year hiatus, is currently the lead vocalist for the American heavy metal band Gwar. Bishop's first band was the Hopewell, VA-based hardcore outfit The Guilty. As a member of Gwar, he was the first to play the role of "Beefcake the Mighty". The name of Beefcake was taken from Bishop's nickname during his punk years. Bishop was the bassist and lead vocalist for Kepone from 1991 through the band's breakup in 1997. All three members of Kepone later performed together again as American Grizzly until that band's breakup in 2005. He played with the Misery Brothers, a country/soul band local to Charlottesville, Virginia from 2007 to 2009.

Bishop earned a Ph.D. in musicology and ethnomusicology from the University of Virginia in 2012 and taught writing and topics in American music history at the university, specializing in popular music ethnography and performance studies.

Since 2011, Kepone has reunited to play occasional shows, although it remains unknown if the band will create any new music. Outside of performing, Bishop:

- teaches undergraduate courses in American music history and writing at the University of Virginia;
- is the Learning Strategist and Lead Technical Writer at education technology company Interfolio

In August 2014, Bishop, portraying the character Blothar, became the lead vocalist for Gwar, replacing Dave Brockie due to Brockie's death on March 23, 2014. Brockie had portrayed the role of Oderus Urungus since the band's 1984 inception.

== Discography ==
Gwar

- Hell-O (1988)
- Scumdogs of the Universe (1990)
- America Must Be Destroyed (1992)
- This Toilet Earth (1994)
- We Kill Everything (1999)
- The Blood of Gods (2017)
- The New Dark Ages (2022)
- Return of Gor-Gor (EP) (2025)

Kepone

- Ugly Dance (1994)
- Skin (1995)
- Kepone (1997)
