= Jacob Brettell =

English Unitarian minister

Jacob Brettell (1793–1862) was an English Unitarian minister.

== Life ==
Brettell was born at Sutton-in-Ashfield, Nottinghamshire, on 16 April 1793. His grandfather was an independent minister at Wolverhampton, and afterwards assistant to James Wheatley at the Norwich Calvinistic Methodist tabernacle.

His father, Jacob Brettell, became a Calvinistic preacher at the age of seventeen, and after serving various chapels became an independent minister at Sutton-in-Ashfield in 1788. Here he renounced Calvinism, and in 1791 opened a separate meeting-house. In 1795 he became assistant to Jeremiah Gill, minister of the 'presbyterian or independent' congregation at Gainsborough, and on Gill's death, 1796, he became sole minister. He also kept a school (see notice by a pupil, E. S. Peacock, in Notes and Queries, 2nd series, xi. 378). He died 19 March 1810.

His only son, Jacob, had been placed at Manchester College, York, in 1809. A public subscription, aided by the vicar of Gainsborough, provided for his continuance at York till 1814. He became Unitarian minister at Cockey Moor (now called Ainsworth), Lancashire, in July 1814, and removed to Rotherham in September 1816. He resigned in June 1859 from failing health. Brettell is described as a good scholar and effective public speaker. He was a strong liberal, and took an active part in the anti-corn-law agitation, being an intimate friend of Ebenezer Elliott (1781–1849), the corn-law rhymester. His poetry shows taste and feeling. His later years were tried by adverse circumstances. He died 12 January 1862.

== Works ==
Brettell published:

- Strictures on Parkhurst's Theory of the Cherubim. Against John Parkhurst, presumed his.
- The Country Minister, a Poem, in four cantos, with other Poems, 1821, (dedicated, 12 July 1821, to Viscount Milton, afterwards fifth Earl Fitzwilliam).
- The Country Minister (Part Second). A Poem, in three cantos, with other Poems, 1825.
- The Country Minister; a poem, in seven cantos: containing the first and second parts of the Original Work : with additional Poems and Notes, 1827, (called 2nd edit.; Brettell's minor pieces are chiefly translations).
- Sketches in Verse, from the Historical Books of the Old Testament, 1828 (one of these, on Balak and Balaam, was printed in Monthly Repository, 1826, pp. 360–7).
- "Staneage Pole" (poem, dated Sheffield 24 February 1834, printed in Christian Reformer, 1834, pp. 182–4).
- The First Unitarian, 1848, (controverting the opinion that 'Cain was the first Unitarian;' Brettell thinks Cain was 'the third Unitarian in strict chronological order').

Some of his hymns are in Unitarian collections. A harvest hymn, 1837, in which he calls the Almighty 'bright Regent of the Skies,' is in James Martineau's collections of 1840 and 1874 (altered in this latter to 'Lord of earth and skies'). Besides these, he contributed some hundreds of uncollected pieces, being hymns and political and patriotic pieces, several of considerable length, to the Christian Reformer, Sheffield Iris, Wolverhampton Herald and other periodicals.

== Family ==
He married, on 29 December 1815, Martha, daughter of James Morris of Bolton, Lancashire, and had four sons and two daughters. His eldest son, Jacob Charles Cates Brettell, born 6 March 1817, was partly educated for the Unitarian ministry at York, became a Roman Catholic, and went to America, where he was successively classical tutor at New York, minister of a German church, and successful member of the American bar in Virginia and Texas; he died at Owensville, Texas, 17 January 1867.
