= Andrés Bretel =

- Born: 24 June 1978 (age 46)
- Origin: Lima, Peru
- Occupation(s): Musician, record producer, singer-songwriter
- Instrument(s): Bass guitar, guitar, vocals
- Years active: 2003–present
- Website: http://www.andresbretel.me

Andrés Bretel (born 24 June 1978) is a Peruvian musician and record producer.

== Career ==
Bretel began his career as a bass guitar player. He played with bands like Nativo Sol and Madre Matilda, and was Master Engineer for Tonka's, album Beta for Morrison Records, in 2005.
