= Kepone (band) =

American indie rock band

Kepone is an American indie rock band based out of Richmond, Virginia. Formed in 1991, the band's name was derived from the Kepone crisis that occurred in the Richmond area in the 1970s. Originally formed as a side project of Michael Bishop of Gwar, the original line-up of the band also included guitarist Tim Harriss of Burma Jam and Hoi-Polloi as well as drummer Seth Harris of Honor Role. Kepone released their debut album, Ugly Dance, through Quarterstick Records in 1994. Harris left soon after to focus on environmental activism, and Ed Trask of the Holy Rollers replaced him. The band released two more albums, Skin and Kepone, before their eventual break up. The three would play separately in other bands before reuniting to form American Grizzly with vocalist Bunny Wells. American Grizzly broke up in 2005.

The band reunited for one night at the 2011 Gwar-B-Q in Richmond, Virginia, on September 17, 2011. Kepone opened for Lamb of God on January 22, 2012, at The National in Richmond, and Gwar on December 21, 2012, at the NORVA in Norfolk, Virginia. Kepone has since reunited to perform on the main stage at Gwar-B-Q 2014 at Hadad's Lake in Richmond.

== Discography ==
=== Albums ===
- Ugly Dance (1994)
- Skin (1995)
- Kepone (1997)

=== Singles ===
- From Ugly Dance
  - 1994 "Henry"
  - 1994 "Ugly Dance"
- From Skin
  - 1995 "Knifethrower"
- From Kepone
  - 1997 "Ghost"
