= Kenn Smith =

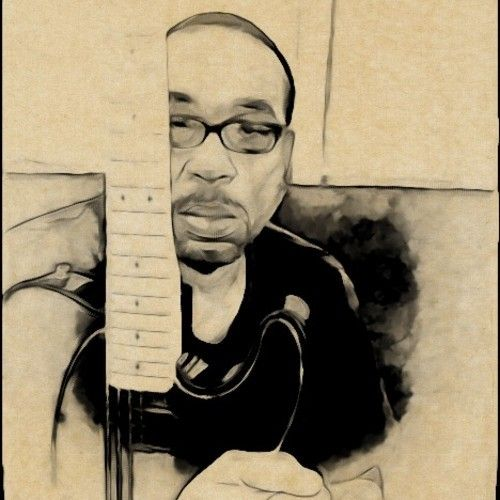

Background information
- Born: Kenneth LaMont Smith; 27 April 1962 (age 64); Chicago, Illinois, North America, United States
- Genres: jazz, instrumental rock, blues, ambient, electronica, progressive rock
- Occupations: musician, producer, composer, guitarist, bassist, educator
- Instruments: guitar, bass
- Years active: 1983-present
- Label: Kenn Smith Music
- Website: kennsmith.wixsite.com/kennsmithmusic

Kenn Smith (born April 27, 1962), birth name Kenneth LaMont Smith, is an American guitarist, bassist, composer, educator and journalist, born in Chicago, Illinois. He plays ambient, jazz, classical, rock and progressive rock. As a recording artist, he has written, produced, and recorded eight solo albums on his own label, Kenn Smith Music.

== Early years ==
As a child he lived on the West Side of Chicago. When the family moved to the south-side of Chicago in 1975, Smith began his guitar studies at age 13 with a visit to the local music store purchasing two Mel Bay books. In 1978, the family moved to the western suburbs of Chicago Maywood, Illinois. At the age of 16 he began classical guitar studies with guitarist Bruce Walters, and later continue studies at Jack Cecchini Studio in Chicago till 1982.

While attending Proviso East High School, he played electric and classical guitar as well as timpani in the Proviso Township Orchestra, electric guitar and bass in the Proviso East High School jazz band, where he received the Louis Armstrong Award for Outstanding Jazz Improvisation during his senior year.

== Career ==
In 1982, Kenn began his career teaching guitar at Robinson's Music Academy in his home town of Maywood, Illinois, as well as performing with local funk and fusion bands in town and the Chicago area. All while attending Columbia College of Chicago, studying music management and production. In 1987 he attend the American Conservatory of Music where he studied jazz guitar and composition. In between those years of teaching, performing and study, he became a fan of progressive rock and fusion, developing skills as a guitarist, bassist and composer.

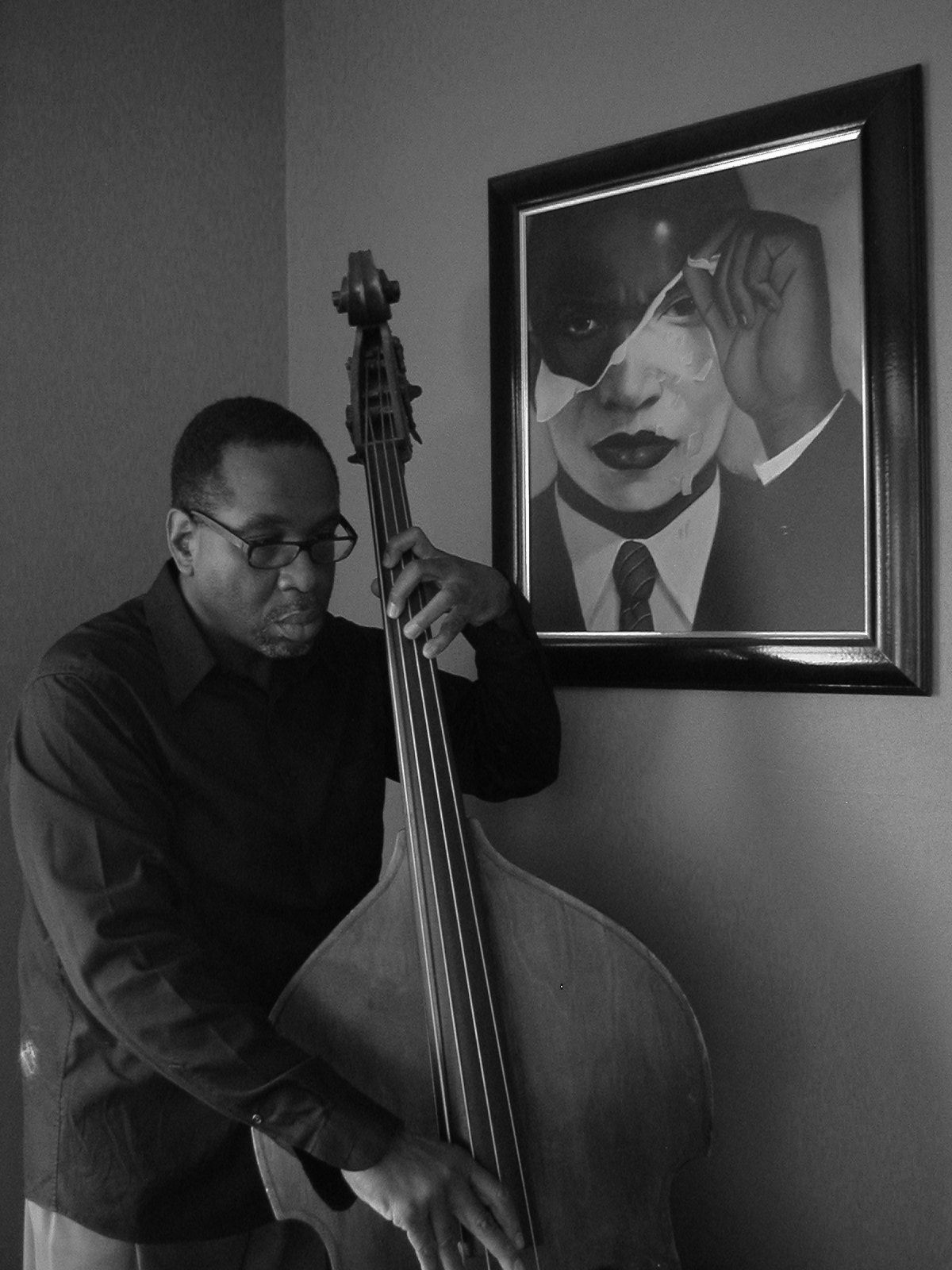
Kenn Smith 2012

In 1986, he began his career as a freelance guitarist and bassist, performing on Chicago's jazz, blues and rock scene. But it wasn't till 1989 his professional career took off, working as a guitarist at the Chicago Cotton Club. Sharing the stage with Bernie Mac, R. Kelly and others who got their start there. It was also where he later formed his first jazz trio and open for jazz musicians Shirley Horn, Stanley Turrentine, Freddie Cole (brother of Nat King Cole), Art Porter. As a jazz side man he played with Jodie Christian, Guy Fricano, Johnny Frigo, Bobby Broom and Najee. In 1992, he was asked to tour as a guitarist with the R&B group the Chi-Lites, and did so until 1994. He then went on doing tours and session work with other performers.

As a recording artist for his own label Kenn Smith Music, he has written, produced and recorded eight (8) albums. (1997) BLUE, (2002) TWO, (2006) Short Stories, (2011) Samples, (2012) If I Remember, (2014) Vintage Me, (2016) Themes and a classical music release (2017) Classic Me.

As an author and journalist he has written an instruction book for electric bass and numerous articles for online magazines Mel Bay Bass Sessions and Bass Musician Magazine.

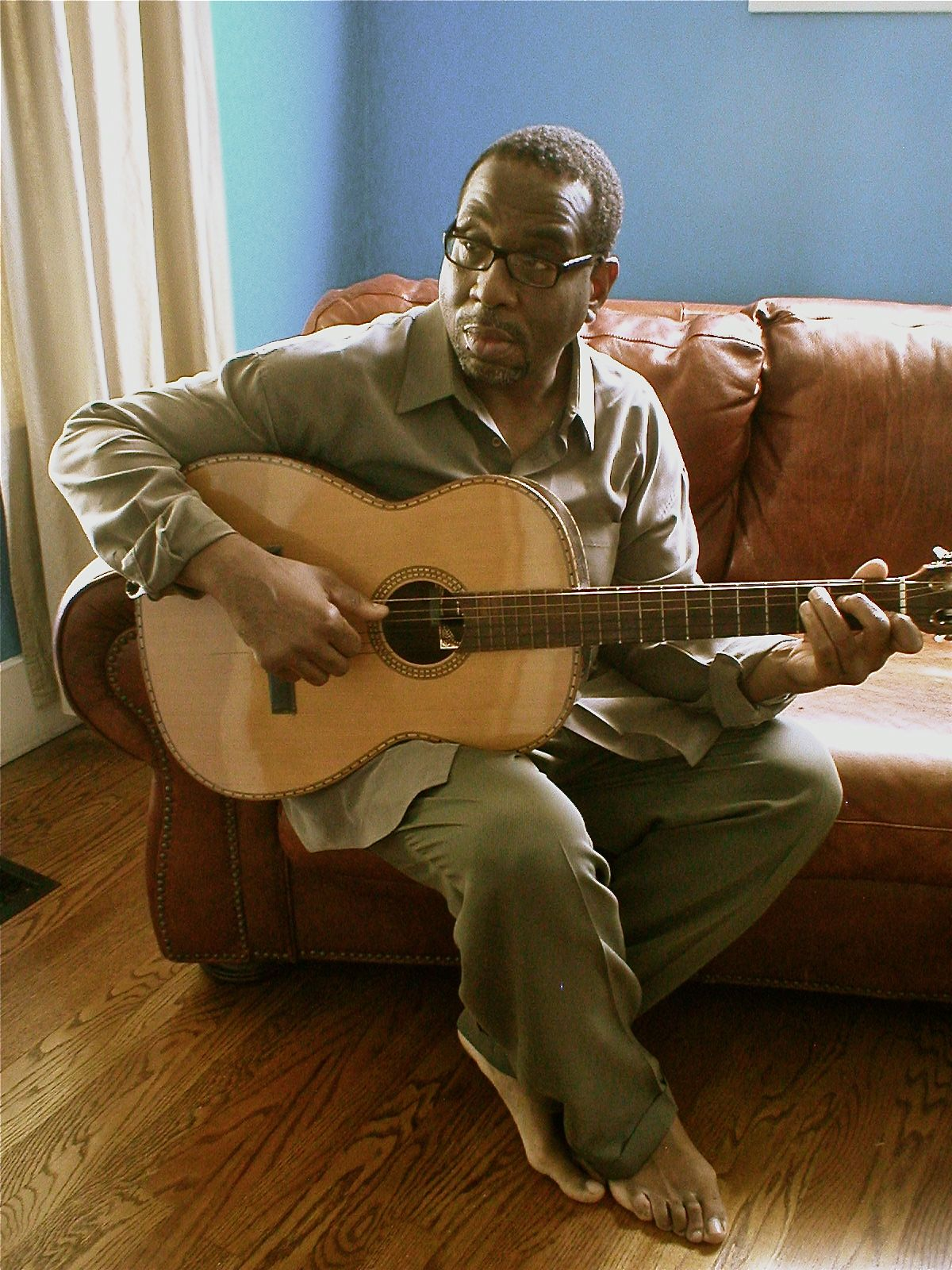
Kenn Smith - Guitarist

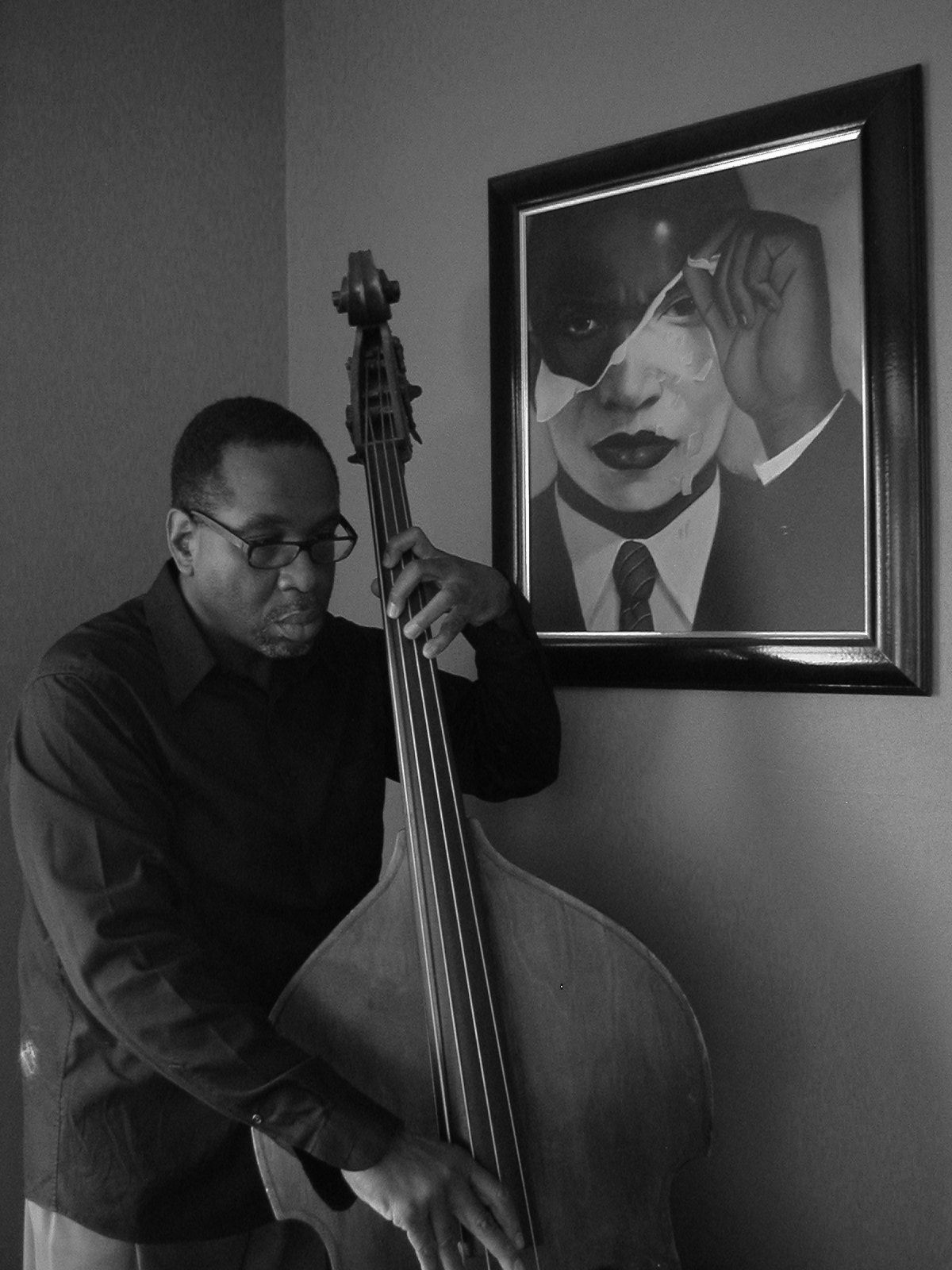
Kenn Smith - Bassist

== Discography ==
=== Solo albums ===
- BLUE (1997)
- TWO (2002)
- Short Stories (2006)
- Samples (2010)
- If I Remember (2012)
- Vintage Me (2014)
- Themes (2016)
- Classic (2017)
