= Aparna Panshikar =

Indian singer

Aparna Panshikar is an Indian classical (Hindustani) vocalist living in Pune, Maharashtra, India.

== Career ==
Panshikar's musical performances include pure Hindustani classical music to semi-classical music and experimentation in combining north Indian classical music with various other genres. The systematic online training method she developed won her a lot of disciples across the globe. She performs with the band Trinaad consisting of Indian bassist Jayen Varma and French drummer Jean Davoisne.

== Early life and family ==
Panshikar had an early introduction to north Indian classical music. Her first guru is late Pandit Bhaskarbua Joshi and is currently training under her mother Meera Panshikar. She is married to Nikhil Joshi and has a son Sohum Bilawal Nikhil Joshi.

== Albums ==
Panshikar has released ten musical albums which include: a Jugalbandi with Sudha Ragunathan released by Manorama Music in 1999; three titles released as "His Master's Voice presents a Voice for the New Millennium" in 2000; Winds from Ayuta in 2002; Diamond Sutra and Punyapur ki Sarita in 2003; Shivoham in 2005; Reflections of a Purple Moon in 2012.; and Le Sortilège du Poisson by Trinaad in 2017.

== Movies ==
Panshikar is also a film music composer. Music for the English movie Orpheder the Legend produced in France in 2016 was composed by her. She has also composed/sung songs for two Indian short films: Muskaan in the year 2017 and Skin of marble in the year 2018
