= Chris McCusker =

Australian songwriter, musician and sound designer

Chris McCusker (born 13 August 1958 in North Lidcombe, Sydney) is an Australian songwriter, musician and sound designer who has worked with many bands over the last 35 years. He has produced albums for many artists and worked for many years in a recording studio in Bathurst, New South Wales called the Laboratory.

== Early years ==
Chris McCusker started performing live with bands as a bassist from 1973. His first band performing some of his, and his older brothers [John McCusker (1956–2006)] songs, from 1974 was a band called Cade. He played in the band The upSwing, from 1986 to 1992 releasing a self titled album "The upSwing" and an EP called Third eye.

== Current projects ==
Chris McCusker is currently working with Higgs Boson and the Strange Charm on their new album "World in denial". He is currently working as a mastering engineer at arthouseMastering and plays bass with Shaking Hands, Copperwing Trio, Emotional Park Vandals and is the last surviving member of the Abercrombie House Jazz Men.

== Discography ==
- Young Blood II (1990 – compilation album – RooArt upSwing
- The upSwing (1991) upSwing
- Third Eye (1993) upSwing
- Cockys Joy Live (1997) Cockies Joy
- Glory Box (1998) Glory Box
- Quantum Connections (2016) Higgs Boson and the Strange Charm
- World in denial (2022) Higgs Boson and the Strange Charm

== Albums mastered ==
- Requested (1988) Peter Coad.
- It's Alright (2010) Spike Flynn.
- When Small Talk Leads To Arguments (2011) Will Tremain.
- Higgs Boson and the Strange Charm (2011) Higgs Boson and the Strange Charm
- Quantum Connections (2016) Higgs Boson and the Strange Charm
- World in denial (2022) Higgs Boson and the Strange Charm

== Filmography ==
- The Complex 2020 (Short) (sound design)
- Angelfish 2016 (Short) (sound design)
- Swingers 2015 (Short) (sound design)
- Last Bites 2014 (Short) (sound design)
- The Hand That Feeds 2013 (Short) (sound design)
- Reception 2011 (Short) (sound design)
- Bored Games 2010 (Short) (sound design)
