= Madre Matilda =

- Genres: Pop punk
- Years active: 1996–2002
- Labels: Discos Hispanos, Columbia/Sony Music Perú
- Members: Pierina Less
- Past members: Carlos Salas, Giorgio Bertolli, Juan José Sandoval, Coco Berenz, Andrés Bretel, Vitucho Malásquez, Chisco Ra mos

Madre Matilda was a Peruvian pop punk band formed in 1996 and disbanded in 2002. Named after a Pink Floyd track, it had two minor hits in with "Regresa" (an electronic arrangement of a traditional Peruvian song) and "Círculos."

== Members ==
- Pierina Less [Vocals]
- Carlos Salas [Guitar]
- Giorgio Bertolli [Drums]
- Jorge Olazo [Drums]
- Juan José Sandoval [Bass]
- Coco Berenz [Guitar]
- Andrés Bretel [Bass]
- Vitucho Malásquez [Bass]
- Chisco Ramos [Guitar]
- Candy Heaventush [Violin]

== Discography ==
- Madre Matilda (1998, Discos Hispanos)
- Círculos (2000, Columbia/Sony Music Perú)

== Videography ==
- Círculos , directed by July Naters and Sergio París.
- Sin Llorar, directed by Eddy Romero
