= Davie504 =

Italian YouTuber and musician (born 1994)

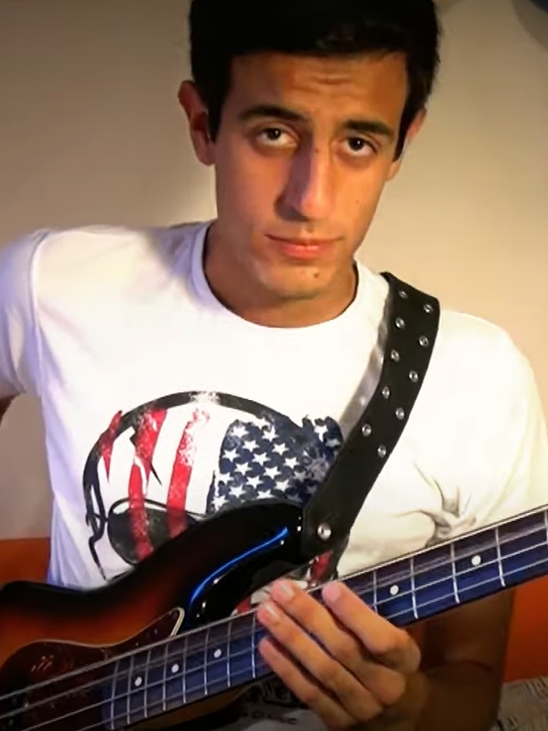
- Biale in 2013
- Born: Davide Biale; 5 April 1994 (age 32); Savona, Liguria, Italy
- Occupations: YouTuber; musician

YouTube information
- Channel: Davie504
- Years active: 2011–present
- Genres: Comedy; novelty; reaction
- Subscribers: 14 million
- Views: 3.71 billion
- Last updated: 5 November 2026

Davide Biale (IPA: [ˈdaːvide ˈbjaːle]; born 5 April 1994), better known online as Davie504, is an Italian musician and YouTuber. He is best known for playing the bass guitar, primarily with a slapping technique, and creating several covers and viral videos.

== Career ==
Biale began playing bass in high school after being influenced and inspired by Kiss bassist Gene Simmons. In 2011, he created a channel named Davie504 and began to upload unconventional cover performances of songs in 2012. Examples of these videos include him using M&M's to cover songs by Eminem, a Korn medley played with corn cobs, and a Red Hot Chili Peppers medley played with actual chili peppers. He also performs musical challenges, which are often suggested to him by comments on his videos, such as playing an uninterrupted slap bass solo for 5 hours, and playing a bassline which Deadmau5 claimed to be "technically impossible".

Biale is also known for uploading meme-related videos and covers. Most notably, he contributed to the PewDiePie vs T-Series competition, where he played a bass cover of "Bitch Lasagna" outside of the T-Series headquarters as well as a video series where he reacts to posts made on his subreddit page. He also participated in a competition with Jared Dines and Steve Terreberry to play the guitar with the most strings.

In 2017, Chowny Bass released the Davie504 signature bass guitar. In May 2019, Biale was listed as number two on MusicRadar's list of "the 20 hottest bassists in the world today". He received his YouTube Gold Play Button later that year, which he turned into a custom bass alongside Amnesia Guitars.

In 2021, Biale was featured on the cover of Bass Player.

In February 2023, Biale performed in a music battle against YouTubers TwoSet Violin at The Star Performing Arts Centre in Singapore, continuing an on-screen feud with the duo since 2020. It was his first-ever live performance.

=== Refusal of censorship and pro-Taiwan remarks ===
On 10 December 2025, Biale uploaded a video revealing for the first time a sponsorship dispute that occurred approximately five years prior (around 2020), in response to criticism from some viewers regarding his acceptance of commercial sponsorships. Biale stated that a mobile game company had offered him a partnership deal worth US$75,000, which included US$60,000 for a promotional video and US$15,000 in sponsorship funds for a fan giveaway.

Biale initially accepted the proposal and paid out-of-pocket for over US$10,000 worth of bass guitars as giveaway prizes. However, after the video was produced, the contract signed, and just two hours before the scheduled upload, the sponsor suddenly demanded that he delete a comment he had posted on YouTube in 2019. They threatened to withdraw all sponsorship funds and refused to reimburse his procurement costs if he did not comply. The comment in question read: "Slap like now for an EPIC 2020 PS:Taiwan is a country, noobs."

Facing pressure from the sponsor, Biale ultimately chose to refuse. He stated that "Taiwan is a country" is merely a geographical fact and emphasized that he is not a political figure; however, he was unwilling to be silenced for money in order to maintain his integrity and freedom of speech. Consequently, he re-edited the video to remove the sponsor's promotional segment before uploading it, and personally covered the costs of the bass guitar giveaway that were originally intended to be paid by the sponsor. He explained that he did not file an international lawsuit at the time because the process would have been too time-consuming and not worth the effort, stating in the video: "Some brands want to pay you to be silent, not to sponsor you." After the incident came to light, it received significant support from netizens.

== Personal life ==
Biale grew up in Albisola Superiore, a comune of Savona, Italy. The number '504' in his nickname is a reference to his day and month of birth, 5 April. He attended the University of Genoa before dropping out to focus on his YouTube career. He later studied music production at a college in London. He moved to Brighton in 2017. In a 2013 Q&A video, Biale cited Flea, Gene Simmons, Marcus Miller and Victor Wooten as some of his favorite bass players.

Biale's wife, also a bassist, is indigenous Taiwanese. They met after she viewed Biale's content online and connected with him. They were married in October 2022.

Biale lived in Taiwan during the COVID-19 pandemic before relocating to Italy in 2022. In May 2026, Biale announced his relocation out of Italy, citing extreme government inefficiency and high taxation as primary reasons and equating living in Italy to being in a toxic relationship.

On 8 February 2026, Biale announced that he was diagnosed with osteopenia during a bone density scan as part of a full body health check.

== Discography ==
=== Studio albums ===
- Let's Funk! (2014)
- Funkalicious (2015)
- Very Impressive (2016)

=== Singles ===
- "Lighter" (2014)
- "Bass Bass Bass" (2020)
- "S L A P P" (2020)
- "Plastic BASS" (Note: A cover of Mariya Takeuchi's "Plastic Love". "Bass" is stylized in all caps: "Plastic BASS".) (2021)
- "Bassless Whisper" (Note: A cover of George Michael's "Careless Whisper".) (2024)
- "Abt." (Note: A cover of Rosé and Bruno Mars' "Apt.". The title is stylized in all caps and the letter b has been replaced with the emoji 🅱️: "A🅱️T.") (2024)
- "Virtual Bassanity" (Note: A cover of Jamiroquai's "Virtual Insanity". "Bass" is stylized in all caps: "Virtual BASSanity".) (2024)
