= Jayen Varma =

Indian electric bass player (born 1961)

- Born: Kerala Varma Jaya Kumar; 3 February 1961 (age 65)
- Origin: Tripunithura, Cochin Kerala, India
- Genres: Ragazz, Funk, Fusion, Experimental
- Occupation: Bassist
- Instruments: Bass guitar, Mridangam, Drums
- Years active: 1981–present
- Website: www.jayenvarma.net

Jayen Varma (born 3 February 1961) is an Indian electric bass player. He is known for developing tabla and mridangam style finger technique on bass guitar to play slap bass. The style developed by him is widely known as Indian slap bass, which won him fans around the globe and accolades from some of the great names in bass guitar like Jeff Berlin, Bootsy Collins, Victor Wooten etc. He belongs to the State of Kerala in India. He performs with the band Trinaad consisting of Indian classical vocalist Aparna Panshikar and French drummer Jean Davoisne. He is also a member of the bands Afro Tala and Firefly.

== Film ==
He is also a playback singer. The single named 'The Country Song' in the Malayalam movie Koothara composed by Gopi Sundar was sung by him.

== Personal life ==
Jayen was born to Kerala Varma and Thankamani in 1961 in Ernakulam district, Kerala. He is married to Kala Varma and has two daughters: Athira Varma and Aswathy Varma. He was working as a gazetted officer in Cochin Devaswom Board and later he took voluntary retirement to pursue a full-time music career.

== Equipment ==
Jayen was using Indian hand made Stelsie bass guitar with Kent Armstrong pickups since 2008. In 2018, he switched to Sire bass guitars. He is also an official artist endorser of Gruv Gear FretWraps and Soundbrenner.
