= Straub =

Straub is a Germanic surname that literally means "one with bushy or bristly hair". Its original meaning in Middle High German is "rough" or "unkempt". It may also refer to people who come from Straubing in Germany. Spelling variations of Straub include Straube, Strauber, Straubinger, Strauble, Strob, Strobel, Strube, Strub, Strufe, Struwe, and Struwing.

The first known Straub in the United States was Johannes Straub, one of the Palatine Germans brought to New York in 1710. There were later arrivals, especially in the Pennsylvania Deutsch region and Ohio, most with an origin in Baden-Württemberg, Hesse-Darmstadt, Rhineland-Palatinate, Bavaria, Austria, the German cantons of Switzerland, and Alsace-Lorraine. Some Straubs who had earlier migrated east out of Germany, settling in German enclaves in Russia and Austria-Hungary (now Romania), have subsequently immigrated to the U.S. as well.

There were two notable breweries founded in Pennsylvania by Straub immigrants. The earliest was the J. N. Straub & Company brewery founded in the 1840s in Allegheny (now Pittsburgh), Pennsylvania, by John N. Straub, immigrant from Hesse-Darmstadt. The other was the Straub Brewery founded in 1872 in St. Marys, Pennsylvania, by Peter P. Straub, immigrant from Felldorf, Württemberg.

Other notable landmarks and companies named after a Straub include Bob Straub State Park in Oregon and Straub Hall at the University of Oregon in Eugene; Straub's Markets, a St. Louis, Missouri-based specialty food retailer; Straub Clinic & Hospital in Hawaii. Straub Honda Dealership in Wheeling, West Virginia

During the Second World War there was a Sclass Cannon destroyer escort named USS Straub that was built for the U.S. Navy. The ship was named after its sponsor, Mrs. Margaret H. Straub.

There is also an asteroid named 6147 Straub.

Notable people with the surname include:

- Agnes Straub, (1890–1941) German film actress
- Alexander Straub (athlete), German pole vaulter
- Bill Straub, American soccer player
- Brunó Ferenc Straub, Hungarian politician
- Calvin Straub, American architect
- Chester J. Straub, American jurist
- Christian Markle Straub, American politician
- Christopher Straub, reality TV contestant
- Elek Straub, Hungarian engineer, consultant and businessman
- Felix Straub, German bobsledder
- Hans Straub (canoeist), Swiss sprint canoer
- Jean-Marie Straub, French filmmaker
- Joe Straub, baseball player
- Johann Baptist Straub, German Baroque artist
- John E. Straub, American political administrator
- Jürgen Straub, East German middle distance runner
- Kris Straub, webcomic creator
- Maria Straub (1838–1898), American songwriter, hymnwriter
- Marianne Straub, 20th century textile designer
- Michael John Straub, artist and printmaker
- Paul F. Straub, Philippine–American War Medal of Honor recipient
- Peter Straub, prolific horror author
- Peter Straub (politician), German politician
- Peter P. Straub, American founder of the Straub Brewery in Pennsylvania
- Philipp Jakob Straub, Austrian sculptor
- Robert W. Straub, American politician from Oregon
- Rudolph Straub, German prisoner-of-war executed during World War II
- Simon Straub, German 17th century luthier and violin maker
- Stephan Straub, German footballer
- Wolfgang Straub, Swiss lawyer and photographer
- Zoë Straub, Austrian singer
