= Israeli mafia =

Organised crime groups consisting of Israeli members

- Founding location: Israel
- Territory: Israel, United States
- Ethnicity: Israeli Jews, Moroccan Jews, Egyptian Jews, Iranian Jews, Israeli Arabs
- Criminal activities: drug trafficking, arms trafficking, human trafficking, white-collar crime, money laundering
- Allies: Ukrainian mafia, Georgian mafia, Russian mafia

The Israeli mafia (Hebrew: מאפיה ישראלית, romanized: Mafiyah Yisraelit, or ארגוני פשע בישראל, Irgunei pesha bəYisrael, 'crime organizations in Israel') are the organized crime groups operating in Israel or consisting of Israeli members. There are 16 crime families operating in Israel, five major groups active on the national level and 11 smaller organizations. There are six Jewish crime families active and three Arab crime families. Many heads and members of the crime groups have either been killed or are in prison.

== Organized crime in Israel ==
The major crime groups are the Abergils, the Abutbuls, the Alperons, the Dumranis, the Shirazis, the Amir Molnar and the Zeev Rosenstein syndicates. The illegal activities they are engaged in include operating casinos and other forms of gambling inside and outside Israel, car theft, prostitution, human trafficking, money laundering, murder, protection and extortion rackets, loan sharking and drug dealing.

According to former Israel Police Commissioner David Cohen, Israeli crime organizations had penetrated the formal economic sector and local governments, and "equipped themselves with large quantities of combat means explosives and arms." In a mob war starting in the early 2000s between the crime families, several crime bosses were killed. It also cost the lives of innocent bystanders. The Lakhbal is the Israeli Special Police Unit that fights organized crime.

=== Effect on US-Israeli relations ===
In 2010, it was reported by Wikileaks that the United States Embassy in Israel expressed grave concern that Inbal Gavrieli, the niece of one of Israel's most powerful mob bosses, had been elected to the Knesset as an MK for the Likud party. Inbal Gavrieli's subsequent attempt to use her parliamentary immunity to prevent her father's house from being searched by the Israel Police during an investigation into illegal gambling and tax evasion further compounded the concerns raised by the United States Ambassador to Israel regarding the influence of organized crime in the Likud central committee. Her father, Ezra "Shuni" Gavrieli, is suspected of being a ranking member of the crime family as he had previously been convicted of racketeering related offenses, as had her brother; in 2009 her cousin was murdered in what is suspected to have been a gangland slaying.

=== North-African and Middle Eastern crime families ===
The immigration of Egyptian and Moroccan Jews to Israel and their settlement in the more impoverished neighborhoods led to the creation of crime families among Maghrebi Jews. This is evident in the fact that a large number of Israeli organized criminals have fled to Morocco in recent years. Israeli crime families of Moroccan Jewish descent expanded their operations to Europe and the US, especially with their involvement in drug trafficking. Some of Israel's more well-known crime families are of North African and Middle Eastern Jewish descent: the Abergil crime family as well as the Abutbul clans are originally from Morocco, the Alperon clan came from Egypt, and the Shirazi clan from Iran.

=== Israeli Arab organized crime ===
Israeli-Arab organized crime groups were formed in Israel. Some Arab-majority cities and towns are home to local crime families. Clans like Tayibe based Abdel-Kader family are involved in extortion, drug and weapon trafficking, fraud as well as money laundering, often in cooperation with their Jewish counterparts. One Arab crime family, the Jarushi family from Ramla, is one of the most powerful crime families in Israel. The Qarajah crime family, also originating from Ramla, used to have a long time blood feud with the Jarushis, resulting in the death of 24 people in the 1990s. The feud ended when the Qarajahs were forced by the government to have a cease fire agreement whereby they will leave Ramla to settle in any other Arab settlement. After no other settlement agreed to house them, the government eventually settled them in the Jewish town Harish. The Abu Latifs, a Druze family from Rameh, which operates mainly in the north, is one of main three Arab crime organizations in Israel.

Another example was the criminal gang around Moussa Aliyan in New York City whose main business was the importation of heroin.

=== Russian mafia and Ukrainian mafia ===
The Russian mafia and Ukrainian mafia in Israel began with the mass immigration of Soviet, Russian Jews and Ukrainian Jews to Israel in 1989. Jewish Russian and Jewish Ukrainian crime bosses such as Semion Mogilevich acquired Israeli citizenship and laundered money through Israel.

The Russian mafia and Ukrainian mafia saw Israel as an ideal place to launder money, as Israel's banking system was designed to encourage aliyah, the immigration of Jews, and the accompanying capital. Following the trend of global financial deregulation, Israel had also implemented legislation aimed at easing the movement of capital. Combined with the lack of anti-money laundering legislation, Russian organised crime found it an easy place to transfer ill-gotten gains. In 2005, police estimated that Russian organised crime had laundered between $5 and 10 billion in the fifteen years since the end of the Soviet Union. Non-Jewish criminals such as Sergei Mikhailov sought to get Israeli passports, using fake Jewish documentation.

Russian and Ukrainian Jewish criminals have also been able to set up networks in the United States, following the large migration of Russian Jews to New York City and Miami, but also in European cities such as Berlin and Antwerp. Russian-Jewish mobsters include Marat Balagula, Evsei Agron and their respective criminal gangs in the United States. Soviet-Jewish criminal groups in the United States are involved in racketeering, prostitution, drug trafficking, extortion, and gasoline tax fraud as well as murder.

==== Georgian organized crime ====
Family-based organized crime groups were formed among Georgian Jewish immigrants to Israel as well. Georgian-Jewish crime families have been able to expand their operations to Western European cities such as Antwerp and Vienna. They are involved in counterfeiting, fraud, money laundering, drug trafficking, weapon trafficking, prostitution and armed robbery. Such was the case with the Georgian-Jewish Melikhov clan in Antwerp.

== In the United States ==
In the 1980s Israelis set up a crime syndicate headed by Johnny Attias in New York, dubbed the "Israeli mafia". It pulled off the biggest gold heist in the history of Manhattan's jewelry district, getting away with over $4 million in gold jewelry. Attias was murdered in January 1990, and New York's Israeli mafia fell apart soon after. Several members, among them Ron Gonen, had turned informant, and the authorities arrested the rest of the gang in September of that year.

Israeli crime organizations such as the Abergil crime family and Zeev Rosenstein were heavily involved in ecstasy trafficking in the United States. In a statement before Congress in 2000, officials with the U.S. Customs Service noted that "Israeli organized-crime elements appear to be in control" of the multibillion-dollar U.S. ecstasy trade, "from production through the international smuggling phase". The main drug supplier of former Gambino crime family underboss Sammy Gravano in his Arizona drug ring allegedly was New York based Israeli mobster Ilan Zarger, who allegedly distributed more than one million ecstasy pills from May 1999 to May 2000 with a wholesale value of $7 million. He pleaded guilty to charges of running a drug gang that flooded Arizona and New York with almost four million ecstasy pills over three years. Another Israeli, Oded Tuito, said to head one of the largest ecstasy-smuggling organization, which imported millions of ecstasy pills from Paris, Brussels and Frankfurt into New York, Miami and Los Angeles, was arrested in May 2001.

In 2006 Zeev Rosenstein was extradited to the U.S., after being arrested in Israel. He pleaded guilty before a federal court in Florida to charges that he distributed ecstasy pills and was sentenced to 12 years in prison which he serves in Israel. In January 2011, Itzik Abergil and Meir Abergil and three other suspects were extradited to the U.S.

They faced a 77-page, 32-count federal indictment that alleged murder, massive embezzlement, money laundering, racketeering and running a large Los Angeles-based ecstasy ring.

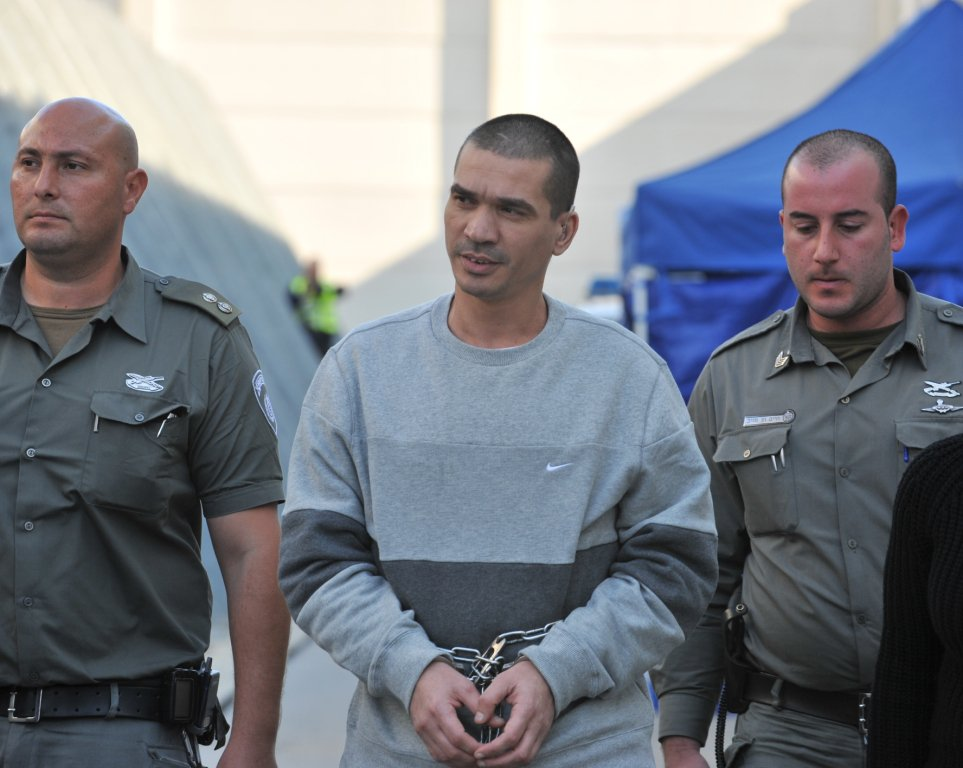
Itzik Abergil, center, escorted by Israeli police officers, January 12, 2011

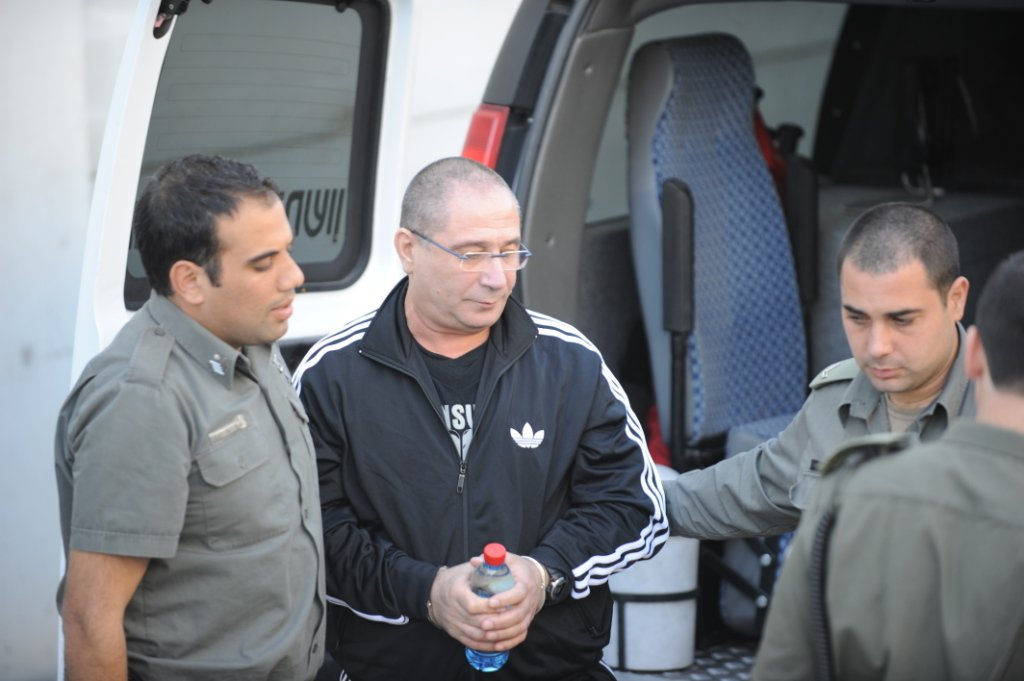
Meir Abergil, January 12, 2011

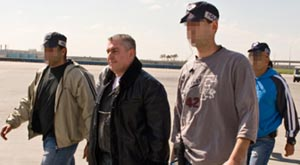
Zeev Rosenstein, escorted by federal agents, on his way from Israel to trial in the U.S.

In 2025 and 2026, Israeli and Italian-American crime families were connected by the U.S. Department of Justice to alleged illegal and rigged poker games involving former NBA basketball players across the U.S.

== In Mexico ==
Two Israeli gangsters, Ben Sutchi and Alon Azulay were shot in broad daylight at a restaurant in a shopping mall in Mexico City on July 24, 2019. The hitwoman, 33-year-old woman named Esperanza Gutiérrez Rojano who was reportedly paid MXN$5,000 (US$260), was arrested. Her alleged accomplice was arrested in Cancun, on July 26. While it was initially linked to a feud between rival Israeli gangsters, the police later suspected that CJNG was involved in the murder, due to alleged business links between the cartel and the gangsters that went wrong at some point, because the cartel suspected that the two Israelis were trying to outsmart and scam them.

Sutchi, who was convicted with the attempted murder of Israeli gangster Meni Aslan, fled to Mexico in the early 2000s and allegedly had connections with Édgar Valdéz Villarreal ("La Barbie"), the former leader of Los Negros.

In December 2022, Gutiérrez was sentenced to 26 years in prison.

== Notable members ==
=== Jewish-Israeli crime figures ===
- Abergil crime family - Top Moroccan Jewish criminal organization in Israel. Based in Lod and Tel Aviv, they involved mostly in drug trafficking and illegal gambling.
- Abutbul crime family - Long-time rivals of the Abergils in the early 2000s. Founded in Netanya by Felix Abutbul (d. 2002) dubbed "king of Netanya's illegal gambling", they made their fortune by running illegal casinos in Israel and Europe.
- Mulner Organization - Ran by Amir Mulner, who claimed in the 2020s that he became a Haredi and abandoned criminal activity.
- Yaakov Alperon - Head of the Egyptian Jewish Alperon Crime Family, until his car bombing assassination on November 17, 2008.
- Ludwig Fainberg - He was a crime figure in America with connections to the Medellin Cartel and the Russian mafia, until he was arrested.
- Zeev Rosenstein - Formerly the top crime figure in Tel-Aviv, until he was caught. He was heavily involved in drug trafficking, mostly ecstasy, and allegedly ran other criminal operations as well.
- Michael Mor - Dubbed "The Shark from Nahariya", he was the head of a criminal organization based in Nahariya, Northern Israel. In his early days, he became involved in the "Avenging Cops affair" where policemen-turned-vigilantes tried to assassinate him in 2006, an affair that was later adapted into TV series named The Cops.
- Shalom Domrani - Former associate of the Abergils and the Alperons, turned independent and led the top criminal organization in Southern Israel in the 2010s.
- Benny Shlomo (d. 2022) - Former associate of Domrani, turned independent while Domrani was imprisoned, and became involved in a long time feud against his former boss. Assassinated in October 2022 by members of the Jarushi family.
- Yossi Musli - Heading the Musli crime organization alongside his brother, Eli Musli.

=== Arab-Israeli crime figures ===
- Ismail Jarushi - Head of the Jarushi crime family headquartered in Ramla.
- Ali Jarushi (d. 2023) - Was a high-ranking member of the Jarushi family, and served as an arbitrator in the Israeli criminal underworld. Assassinated in January 2023, possibly as a revenge for the death of Benny Shlomo.
- Ayman Qarajah - Former head of the Qarajah crime family, now headquartered in Harish (after their exile from Ramla). Relocated to Georgia in the 2020s and claimed to abandon criminal activity.
- Qutayer Odeh - Head of a criminal organizarion headquartered in Tayibe. His organization is known for extreme violence and threatening police officers.
- Latif Abu Latif - Head of the Druze-Israeli Abu Latif clan from Rameh. His organization is considered to be the top Arab criminal organization in Northern Israel and involved mostly in drug and arms trafficking from Lebanon.
- Nasr Hariri - Head of the Hariri clan involved in money laundering, racketeering, drug and arms trafficking.

== See also ==
- Crime in Israel
- Georgian mafia
- Jewish-American organized crime
- Moroccan mafia
- Romanian mafia
