= WKBI =

WKBI can refer to:

- WKBI-FM, a radio station (93.9 FM) in Saint Marys, Pennsylvania, United States
- WKBI (AM), a radio station (1400 AM) in Saint Marys, Pennsylvania, United States
