= KOYM =

KOYM may refer to:

- St. Marys Municipal Airport (ICAO code KOYM)
- KOYM-LP, a low-power radio station (99.7 FM) licensed to serve Houston, Texas, United States
