= Benzinger Township, Elk County, Pennsylvania =

Coordinates: 41°26′15″N 78°32′34″W

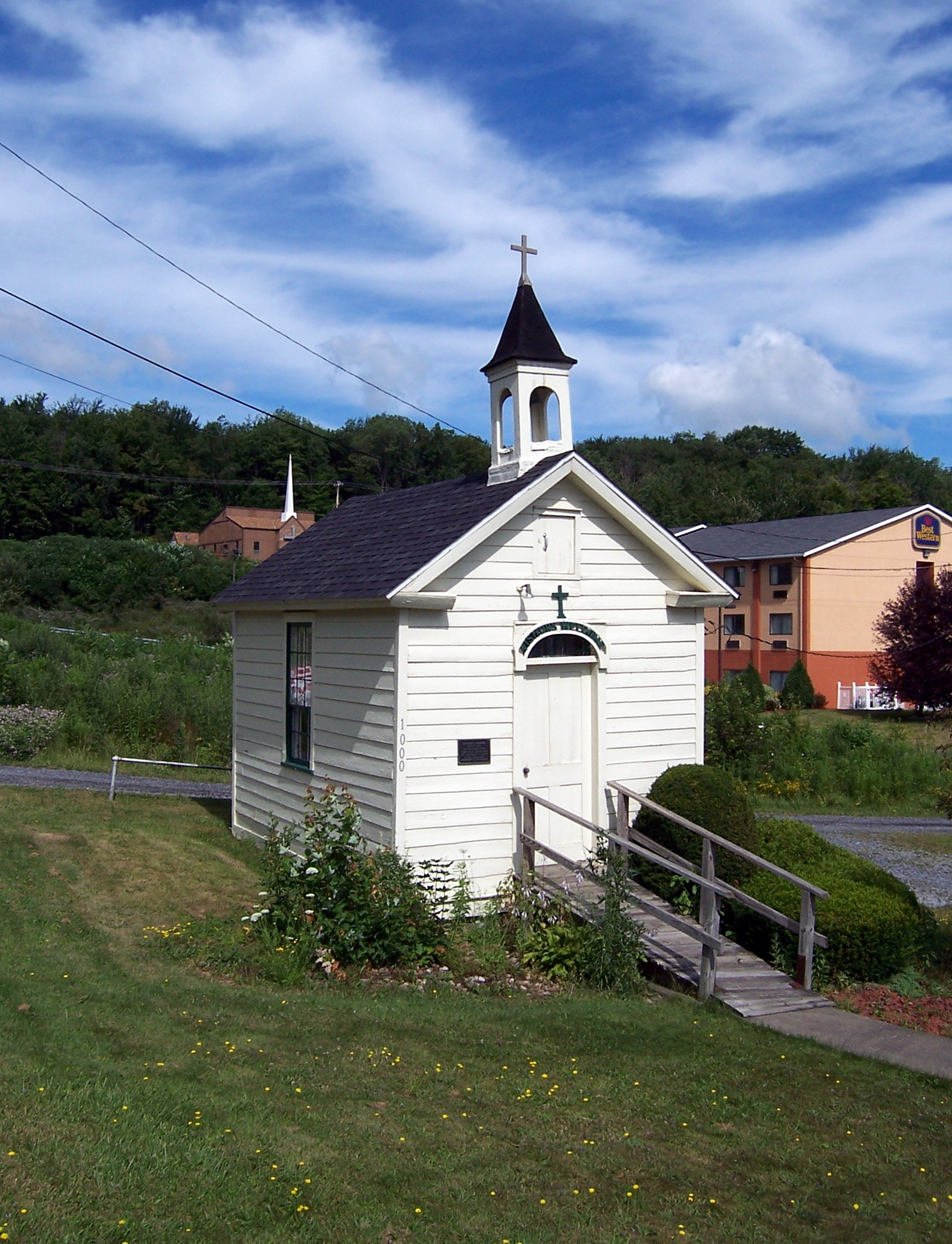
Decker's Chapel, about 2 miles south of central St. Marys

Benzinger Township was a township in Elk County, Pennsylvania. According to the 1990 census, it had a population of 8,509. It was settled in 1842 and created on December 18, 1845. On November 5, 1991, the citizens of Benzinger Township voted for the Borough of St. Marys and Benzinger Township to be consolidated into the City of St. Marys. The city was officially recognized by the Governor of Pennsylvania on June 18, 1992.
