= Inbal Gavrieli =

Israeli politician

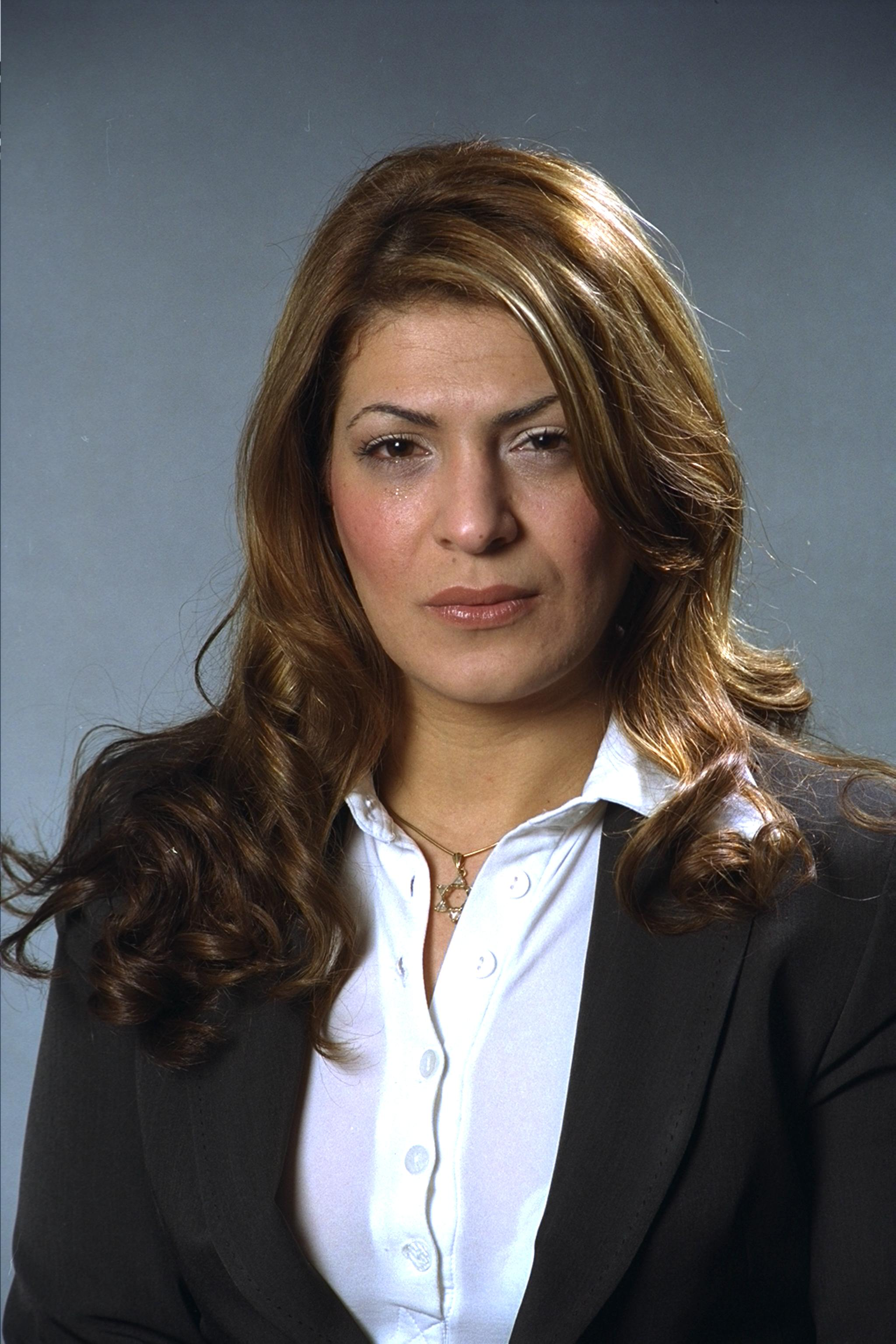
- Gavrieli in 2003

Faction represented in the Knesset
- 2003–2006: Likud

Personal details
- Born: 25 September 1975 (age 50) Tel Aviv, Israel

Inbal Gavrieli (Hebrew: ענבל גבריאלי; born 25 September 1975) is an Israeli former politician who served as a member of the Knesset for Likud from 2003 until 2006.

== Biography ==
Gavrieli was born in Tel Aviv to a family of Iraqi Jewish origins. Her family has been in Israel for nine generations and several of her ancestors were involved in the Irgun. Multiple members of her immediate and extended family are suspected of involvement in organized crime; nationally the Gavrieli family name is often considered synonymous with organized crime in Israel with her father and brother both having been arrested for operating illegal gambling businesses, and her cousin was murdered as part of a suspected dispute with the Abergil crime family. Gavrieli did her mandatory service in the Israel Defense Forces as a producer for Israel Army Radio, then studied law at IDC Herzliya, where she gained a BA. She also studied for a BA in business administration.

For the 2003 elections she was placed 30th on the Likud list, and entered the Knesset when the party won 38 seats. Her election and subsequent attempt to use her parliamentary immunity to stop her father's house being searched by police during an investigation into illegal gambling and tax evasion raised concerns from the United States Ambassador to Israel regarding the influence of organised crime in the Likud central committee, as her father, Ezra "Shuni" Gavrieli, is suspected of being involved in organised crime. The Movement for Quality Government requested that the attorney general open a criminal investigation into the issue. During her first term in the Knesset, she served as chairwoman of the Committee on the Status of Women and Gender Equality.

In 2004 Gavrieli and Adi Barkan, an Israeli fashion photographer and owner of the Barkan Modeling Agency in Tel Aviv, successfully submitted legislation to the Knesset requiring all Israeli modeling agencies to use a minimum body mass index (BMI) of 18.5 as a pre-requisite for employment, a first of its kind in the world. She lost her seat in the March 2006 elections.

Gavrieli was married to football goalkeeper Liran Strauber. They had one son, Michael. The couple divorced in July 2009. She then entered a relationship with Ran Remo and had two more children, a son and daughter.

=== Reality television career ===
Gavrieli has taken part in a number of reality television shows, becoming a popular celebrity in Israel. In 2012, she came in fifth place in Israel's Survivor. She also appeared in Channel 20's Patriots program in 2015.
