= Bavarian PtzL 3/4 =

Bavarian PtzL 3/4 DRG Class 97.1
Type and origin
- Builder: Krauss (s/n 6632–6634, 8033)
- Build date: July/August/September 1912, 1923
- Total produced: 4
Specifications
- Configuration
  - Whyte: 0-6-2RT
  - UIC: C1′ h2(4v)t
  - German: Z 34.15
- Gauge: 1,435 mm (4 ft 8 1/2 in)
- Driver dia.: 1,006 mm (3 ft 3 5/8 in)
- Trailing dia.: 800 mm (2 ft 7 1/2 in)
- Rack system: Emil Strub
- Length
  - Over beams: 10,490 mm (34 ft 5 in)
- Axle load: 15.6 tonnes (15.4 long tons; 17.2 short tons)
- Adhesive weight: 46.2 t (45.5 long tons; 50.9 short tons)
- Service weight: 57.8 t (56.9 long tons; 63.7 short tons)
- Fuel capacity: Coal
- Water cap.: 4 m^{3} (880 imp gal; 1,100 US gal)
- Boiler
- Heating tube length: 3,800 mm (12 ft 5 1/2 in)
- Boiler pressure: 12 kgf/cm^{2} (1,180 kPa; 171 lbf/in^{2})
- Heating surface
  - Firebox: 1.85 m^{2} (19.9 sq ft)
  - Evaporative: 71.69 m^{2} (771.7 sq ft)
- Superheater
  - Heating area: 25.40 m^{2} (273.4 sq ft)
- Cylinders: Adhesive: 2; Rack: 4
- Cylinder size: 508 mm (20 in)
- Piston stroke: 460 mm (18 1/8 in)
- Cogwheel drive cylinder bore: 508 mm (20 in)
- Cogwheel drive piston stroke: 460 mm (18 1/8 in)
- Transmission: superheated steam, 2 cylinders in adhesive working, 4 compound cylinders in rack working
- Couplers: Standard buffers with coupling hooks
Performance figures
- Maximum speed: Adhesive: 45 km/h (28 mph); Rack, 4101–03: 12 km/h (7.5 mph); Rack, 4104: 18 km/h (11 mph)
- Indicated power: Adhesive: 530 PS (390 kW; 523 hp); Rack: 560 PS (412 kW; 552 hp)
Career
- Numbers: K.Bay.Sts.E: 4101–4104; DRG: 97 101 – 97 104 in Passau shed
- Retired: 1954 (1), May 1963 (3)

The Bavarian Class PtzL 3/4 engines with the Royal Bavarian State Railways (Königlich Bayerische Staats-Eisenbahnen) were rack railway locomotives whose cogwheel drive was designed for working on tracks with a Strub rack. In 1923 they were incorporated by the Deutsche Reichsbahn as DRG Class 97.1 (Baureihe 97.1) in their numbering plan. The locomotives remained on their regular route between Erlau and Wegscheid until the closure of this rack railway in 1963. The last journey was on 5 January 1963. They were scrapped in April 1964 at Simbach am Inn.

== See also ==
- Royal Bavarian State Railways
- List of Bavarian locomotives and railbuses
