= Jeff Lloyd (American football) =

American football player (born 1954)

No. 75, 74
- Position: Defensive end

Personal information
- Born: March 14, 1954 (age 72); St. Marys, Pennsylvania, U.S.
- Listed height: 6 ft 6 in (1.98 m)
- Listed weight: 255 lb (116 kg)

Career information
- High school: Cameron Co. (PA)
- College: West Texas A&M
- NFL draft: 1976: 3rd round, 62nd overall pick

Career history
- Buffalo Bills (1976); Kansas City Chiefs (1978)

Career NFL statistics
- Sacks: 2
- Fumble recoveries: 1
- Stats at Pro Football Reference

Jeffrey John Lloyd (born March 14, 1954) is an American former professional football player who was a defensive end in the National Football League (NFL). He played college football for the West Texas A&M Buffaloes and played in NFL for the Buffalo Bills and Kansas City Chiefs.

At West Texas A&M University Lloyd played as an offensive lineman and was selected to play in the Senior Bowl after the 1975 season.

Lloyd was selected by the Seattle Seahawks with the 62nd overall pick in the third round of the 1976 NFL draft. The Seahawks waived him before the 1976 season. He then signed with the Bills before the season started, and played in 9 games for the Bills in 1976. The Chiefs signed him after the 1977 season. He played in all 16 regular season games for the Chiefs in 1978, starting 4 and recovering one fumble.
