= Peter P. Straub =

American businessman (1850–1913)

Peter P. Straub (1850–1913) is the founder of the Straub Brewery in St. Mary's, Pennsylvania.

== Life and career ==
Straub was born 28 June 1850 in Felldorf, Starzach, Kingdom of Württemberg (now in Germany), to Anton Straub and his wife, Anna Maria Eger. The Straub family had been brewing a local beer for generations. As expected Peter learned a trade important to the brewing art. He became a Cooper, a craftsman who makes wooden barrels. Peter aspired to be a brewer and at the age of 19 in 1869 immigrated to the United States for a better and more prosperous life. Upon his arrival in the United States he found employment at the Eberhardt and Ober Brewing Company in Pennsylvania. Peter admired his employers' pledge to forfeit $1,000 if any adulteration was found in their beer, and as he honed his brewing skills to a sharp edge, he adhered faithfully to this promise. Eventually he tired of city life and moved north to Brookville, where he perfected his brewing process while working in the Christ and Algeir Brewery.

Peter later moved to Benzinger (St. Marys), where he met and married Sabina Sorg of Benzinger. The couple settled in Benzinger and had ten children: Francis X., Joseph A., Anthony A., Anna M., Jacob M., Peter M. (who died at two years of age), Peter P., Gerald B., Mary C., and Alphons J.

Peter's employment in Benzinger was with the Joseph Windfelder Brewery and he worked there until he purchased the Benzinger Spring Brewery (founded by Captain Charles C. Volk in 1855) from his father-in-law, Francis Xavier Sorg. It was then that Straub Beer and the Straub Brewery was born.
