= B94 =

B94 could be the moniker for:

- WBZZ HD2 in Pittsburgh, Pennsylvania
- B94, a postcode district in the B postcode area
- WKBI-FM in Saint Marys, Pennsylvania
- WNLI in State College, Pennsylvania, which formerly branded as B94.5
- KDKA-FM in Pittsburgh, Pennsylvania, which formerly branded as B94
- Sicilian Defence, Najdorf Variation, according to the Encyclopaedia of Chess Openings
- Burley Griffin Way, a road in NSW, Australia connecting Canberra with Griffith, designated as B94
