= WDDH =

Coordinates: 41.618°N 78.804°W

- Saint Marys, Pennsylvania; United States
- Broadcast area: Saint Marys, Pennsylvania; Ridgway, Pennsylvania; Emporium, Pennsylvania and the western Twin Tiers and Dubois, PA
- Frequency: 97.5 MHz
- Branding: "97.5 The Hound"

Programming
- Format: Classic Country
- Affiliations: Fox News Radio; Compass Media Networks; United Stations Radio Networks

Ownership
- Owner: Laurel Media Inc.
- Sister stations: WKBI, WKBI-FM

History
- Call sign meaning: Welcome Dennis D. Heindl

Technical information
- Licensing authority: FCC
- Facility ID: 6683
- Class: B
- ERP: 19,500 watts

Links
- Public license information: Public file; LMS
- Webcast: Listen Live
- Website: houndcountry.com

WDDH (97.5 FM) is an American radio station, licensed to Saint Marys, Pennsylvania. The station operates at an equivalent radiated power of 50,000 watts. Its studios and offices are located in Ridgway Township, near the summit of Bootjack Mountain, about 3 miles south of downtown Ridgway and about 2 miles west of its city of license. Its transmitter site is located in Lamont, about 2.5 miles south of Kane, Pennsylvania. The station also uses a booster, WDDH-FM1 with 250 watts at 171 feet AGL along South Highland Street in DuBois, about 20 miles south of the Ridgway studios. The station operates a classic country music format.

== History: beginnings as WKYN-FM ==
The station first went on the air on April 22, 1986, as WKYN, and was founded by suburban Pittsburgh radio personality Bob Stevens, who had been looking to buy or build a radio station of his own in Western Pennsylvania. That opportunity presented itself in 1985, when he successfully applied for the license to operate at 97.5 FM, originally licensed to Ridgway.

For the first three years, the studios and transmitter were located at the transmitter site in a remote, wooded area of Jones Township near Rasselas, Pennsylvania, with business and sales offices in downtown St Marys. Signals were radiated by a 4-bay, ERI "Rototiller" antenna atop a newly erected 535 foot tower. On several occasions, air staff were stranded at the studio/transmitter facility due to heavy snow accumulation and ice storms. In 1989, Stevens purchased a defunct drive-in theater south of St Marys, and consolidated both the studios and offices there.

As the station grew, Stevens determined that the station would reach a significantly larger audience if the transmitter site was relocated to the west. Much of the original signal coverage area fell on a largely unpopulated area of north-central Pennsylvania known as "God's Country", and was spotty in several better-populated communities to the west. A new transmitter site south of Kane was found and construction was started. The STL path from the Fairview studios to the new transmitter site was not possible due to obstruction by Bootjack Mountain. Stevens renovated a vacant, former restaurant at the top of Bootjack Mountain to house the offices and studios, where they remain today at 14902 Bootjack Road. The old tower and transmitter plant in Jones Township were left standing, and purchased by a cellular phone service provider.

=== Programming ===
WKYN, billed as "97 KYN", signed on with an Adult CHR format. Stevens stuck with this formula for seven years, until the opportunity presented itself in 1993 to acquire WCCZ (now WPCL) in Spangler. WCCZ operated on the adjacent frequency of 97.3 and could be heard clearly in the more populous area of Johnstown, Pennsylvania. Stevens purchased WCCZ and changed the call letters to WXVE, turning it into a translator to extend WKYN's signal into the Johnstown market. At the time of the acquisition, WKYN became WKVE (an allusion to Pittsburgh's legendary AOR station WDVE) and the station changed format from Adult CHR to AOR, as there was no album rock formatted station in Johnstown at that time.

In 1996, Stevens had the opportunity to buy a radio station closer to his hometown in Western Pennsylvania, purchasing WHJB (now WKHB) and WBCW (now WKFB) in Greensburg and Jeannette, respectively. WKYN was sold to Cam Communications, reverting to Adult CHR as "97.5 The Peak". Call letters were changed to WPKK. In 2001, Cam Communications sold WPKK to Laurel Media, Inc of Ridgway, a company owned by Dennis Heindl, who previously owned WLMI in Kane and held a construction permit for an FM station in Reynoldsville (now WDSN.) DDH are the initials of Dennis D. Heindl. A lifelong country music lover, Heindl converted the station format to Country.

In 1999, ownership was transferred from Laurel Media Inc. to Intrepid Broadcasting owned by Michael Stapleford.

== WDDH today ==
In the Summer of 2008, ownership reverted to Laurel Media Inc. and Dennis D. Heindl.

Today, WDDH continues to serve more than a million listeners in North Western Pennsylvania and southwestern New York with a classic country format.

The station airs programming voicetracked by local personalities throughout the day, as well as the syndicated Big D & Bubba program in the morning. On Sunday mornings, they air religious programming, which is followed by "The Hound's Polka Party," hosted by afternoon host JJ Michaels (a successor to the Don Williams Polka Review that played in the time slot until Williams's death), and "Talk Of The Town," a public affairs program hosted by owner Denny Heindl, in which Lou Dobbs was once a guest. They also broadcast Pittsburgh Pirates games, as well as local high school sports. Heindel also happens to be a part-owner of the Pirates.

On January 1, 2023, WDDH shifted to a pure classic country format, eliminating most of its current hits from the station's playlist. They had long included substantially more classic cuts than most mainstream country radio stations even before the format change.

In September 2026, the station quietly flipped back to a contemporary country format, a change that would only last a few weeks. Due to listener demand, the Hound reverted to a classic country format on October 8, 2026.
