= Adi Barkan =

Israeli model agent and activist

- עדי ברקן
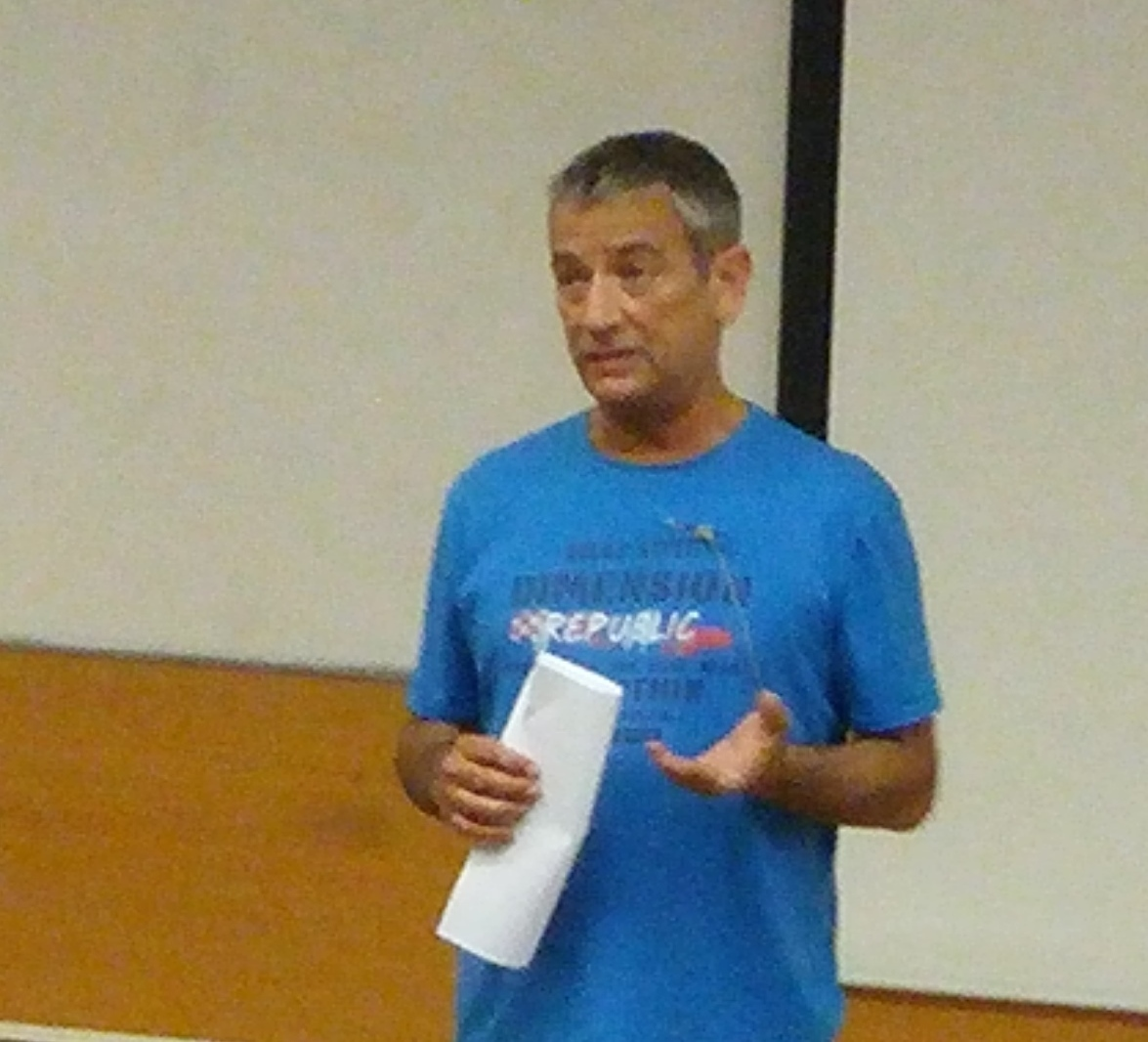
- Barkan in 2015
- Occupations: Modeling agent & activist
- Organization: RealUnreal Project

Adi Barkan (Hebrew: עדי ברקן) is an Israeli model agent and activist who has campaigned for legislation banning the use of anorexic models. Barkan started his career as a fashion photographer.

== Biography ==
Barkan worked as a fashion photographer for fifteen years in Paris, London and New York, before returning to Israel in 1998 to open his own modeling agency in Tel Aviv. Barkan, who worked with Elite Model Management, discovered a number of models including Sendi Bar.

In 2001 he started publishing the "Bikini" magazine, which mostly featured photographs of models in swimsuits. It was heavily promoted through advertisement on bus stops, although it was discontinued after less than year due to low sales and public outcry about its indecency.

After speaking on television about his experience with model Hila Elmalich, an anorexic woman whom he rushed to hospital after she collapsed and who later died, Barkan was deluged by telephone calls from girls and young women with anorexia. This experience persuaded him to require all of his models to submit to body mass index (BMI) exams to demonstrate their physical health and lack of an eating disorder.

Working with Member of Knesset Inbal Gavriely, he successfully submitted legislation to the Israeli Knesset in December, 2004, requiring all modeling agencies in Israel to use the BMI exam, making Israel one of the first countries to pass such a bill. Subsequently, an agency will not be allowed to continue representing a model unless she submits to a health test every three months and receives higher than 18.5 BMI. Any agency that does not comply will be fined accordingly and all forms will be monitored by the Israeli Health Ministry. The campaign has received backing by both the Ministry of Health and The Israeli Center for Eating Habits Reform, while additionally, more than 30 Israeli CEOs have agreed to only hire models who have passed the health exam for their advertisements.

The Law for Restricting Weight in the Modeling Industry, passed in 2012, sets limits on both the employment of ultra-thin models and the use of Photoshop in advertising.

In November 2013, Barkan launched the Simply-You campaign to increase awareness of the effect of the fashion industry on body self-image. A 12-lesson program was devised for models to teach them about proper nutrition and how to maintain their weight at healthy levels. Shortly after the launch of the Simply You campaign, H&M was the first company to ever admit using too skinny models in their campaigns.

In 2015, Barkan was chosen to deliver a TED talk on the subject. As part of the RealUnreal Project, Barkan travels around the country to create awareness among IDF soldiers, male and female, on the subject of eating disorders.

== See also ==
- Israeli fashion
