= Strub =

Strub is a last name of German origin, and may refer to:

- Emil Strub (1858–1909), Swiss railway builder and inventor of the Strub rack system
- Charles H. Strub (1884–1958), American dentist and entrepreneur
- Joseph Strub (1833–1890), Spiritan Roman Catholic priest who founded Duquesne University in Pittsburgh, Pennsylvania
- David Strub (1897–1985), President of the Landtag of Liechtenstein
- Max Strub (1900–1966), German violinist
- Sean Strub (born 1958), American writer and activist
- Susanne Eberle-Strub (born 1960), Liechtenstein politician
- Whitney Strub, academic

== See also ==
- Strub Quartet, German string quartet
- Strub Stakes, American horse race
- Strube
- Straub
