= Cameron County School District =

School district in Pennsylvania

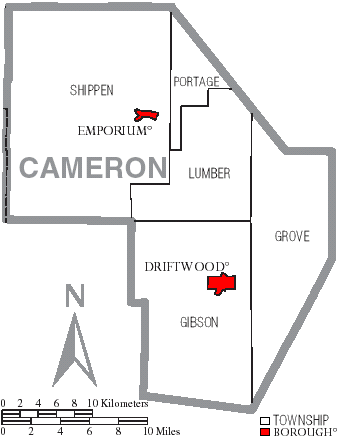
- Map of Cameron County, Pennsylvania

Address
- 601 Woodland Avenue Emporium, Cameron County, Pennsylvania, 15834-1043; United States

District information
- Type: Public

Other information
- Website: http://www.cameroncountyschools.org/

The Cameron County School District is a small, rural, public school district, which covers the whole of Cameron County, Pennsylvania. The district encompasses approximately 401 square miles (1,040 km^{2}). Per the 2010 US Census Bureau, Cameron County School District's population declined to 5,080 people. According to 2000 federal census data, it served a resident population of 5,974. The educational attainment levels for the Cameron County School District population (25 years old and over) were 86.2% high school graduates and 13.9% college graduates. The district is one of the 500 public school districts of Pennsylvania.

According to the Pennsylvania Budget and Policy Center, 52.9% of the district's pupils lived at 185% or below the Federal Poverty Level as shown by their eligibility for the federal free or reduced price school meal programs in 2012. In 2009, Cameron County School District residents’ per capita income was $15,968, while the median family income was $39,479. In the Commonwealth, the median family income was $49,501 and the United States median family income was $49,445, in 2010. By 2013, the median household income in the United States rose to $52,100. In 2014, the median household income in the USA was $53,700.

Cameron County School District operates two schools: Cameron County High School (7th-12th) and Woodland Elementary School (K-6th). High school students may choose to attend Seneca Highlands Career and Technical Center for training in the trades. The Seneca Highlands Intermediate Unit IU9 provides Cameron County School District with a wide variety of services like specialized education for disabled students and hearing, speech and visual disability services and professional development for staff and faculty.

== Extracurriculars ==
The district offers a variety of clubs, activities and an extensive sports program.

=== Sports ===
The district funds:

Boys

- Baseball - A
- Basketball- A
- Football - A
- Golf - AA
- Track and Field - AA
- Wrestling - AA

Girls

- Basketball - A
- Golf - AA
- Softball - A
- Track and Field - AA
- Volleyball - A

Junior High School Sports

Boys

- Basketball
- Football
- Wrestling

Girls

- Basketball
- Volleyball

According to PIAA directory July 2012
