= Straube =

Straube is a German surname. Notable people with the surname include:

- Emil J. Straube (born 1952), Swiss and American mathematician
- Erich Straube (1887–1971), German general
- Karl Straube (1873–1950), German church musician, organist, and choral conductor
- Kasper Straube (15th century), German printer
- Rudolf Straube (1717–1785), German composer, J. S. Bach's pupil

== See also ==
- Straub
- Straube Piano Company
