= Yaakov Alperon =

Israeli mobster

- יעקב אלפרון
- Born: February 18, 1955; Givat Shmuel, Israel
- Died: November 17, 2008 (aged 53); Tel Aviv, Israel
- Cause of death: Car bomb

Grave of Yaakov Alperon at Kfar Nachman cemetery

Yaakov Alperon (Hebrew: יעקב אלפרון; February 18, 1955 – November 17, 2008) was an Israeli mobster, head of the Alperon criminal family, which became one of the largest organized crime syndicates in Israel, until his assassination by car bomb in 2008.

== Biography ==
Yaakov Alperon was born in Israel in 1955, to a poor family of Jewish immigrants from Egypt, and grew up in a small apartment in Givat Shmuel. Alperon and his brothers learned boxing and began taking over small businesses in the area, before eventually the family gained power by protection rackets across the Gush Dan region of Israel. Alperon was first arrested when he was in his twenties, and 1993, he was jailed for 4.5 years after the police shut down his extortion business. Two of his brothers, Nissim and Zalman, were also convicted.

Alperon's main enemies included Zeev Rosenstein, a notorious drug lord in Israel who had also been the target of murder attempts, and the Abutbul and Abergil families over money from bottle recycling, an industry that brings in US$5 million a year, based on police estimates. As part of a protection racket offered to restaurant owners, the businesses would pay for the mobsters' "services" by leaving empty bottles, which would leave no documentation and could be redeemed for cash to provide an apparently legitimate revenue source.

In March 2004, Israeli police arrested four suspected contract killers from Belarus who had been found with weapons, including explosives and shoulder-held missile launchers, at their hideout. The arrested hitmen had been accused of involvement in a failed murder attempt against Yaakov Alperon in December 2003, and earlier attempts that same year against Alperon's brother Nissim and another attack against a member of a crime family linked with the Alperons.

On January 2, 2006, a summit between Alperon and a rival gangster, Amir Mulner, was held at a hotel north of Tel Aviv with the intention to address their differences. The arbitration efforts failed, gun and knife fights broke out and Mulner was stabbed in the neck, allegedly by Alperon. Afterwards Alperon and his son went into hiding, and were not found despite a two-month nationwide search; however the two later turned themselves in to police custody. In March 2006, Alperon and his brother Reuven were charged with "making threats, attempted assault, and intentionally damaging a car" for their involvement in the incident.

Shortly before alperon's death, an article published in Haaretz indicated that he had been involved in heating oil schemes with other gangsters. Alperon had also been involved in setting up Internet cafés during a time when few had computer access at home, in which the fee paid for use of the computer would be paid in cash to the restaurant and would then be used to gamble on the computer. The internet business was shut down in spring 2002 after mounting costs started to exceed the gambling revenues.

Alperon had served several prison terms, and had just been released from a 10-month prison sentence served as part of a plea deal. He had been arrested for stabbings, assault, blackmail and intimidation over the course of his career.

== Death ==
Fifty-three-year-old Alperon was killed on November 17, 2008, by a bomb explosion in his white Volkswagen Jetta car, at the crowded intersection of Yehuda HaMaccabi Street and Namir Road in Tel Aviv. The explosion killed Alperon, and at least three other people, including a 13-year-old boy, were wounded. Police were trying to determine the identity of a vehicle that had been spotted driving away from the site of the explosion. The body was identified as wearing the same shirt that Alperon had been wearing in court for an indictment of his son. His funeral on November 18, 2008, at Ra'anana Cemetery was attended by thousands, including several known Israeli underworld figures. At the grave site, one of Alperon's sons was quoted as saying that "We will find the man who did this. I'll send this man to God. He won't have a grave because I'll cut off his arms, his head, and his legs".

=== Alperon family ===
Alperon's brother Nissim Alperon survived assassination attempts in 2000, 2002, two in 2003, 2006, two in 2007, 2012, and 2013, some of which involved car bombs. A car explosion in Tel Aviv in January 2013, lightly wounding seven people but not Nissim, was reported possibly to have been a further attempt to assassinate him.
