= Nate Sestina =

American basketball player (born 1997)

- Sestina with ASVEL in 2026

No. 77 – ASVEL
- Position: Power forward / center
- League: LNB Élite; EuroLeague

Personal information
- Born: May 12, 1997 (age 29) St. Marys, Pennsylvania, U.S.
- Listed height: 6 ft 9 in (2.06 m)
- Listed weight: 234 lb (106 kg)

Career information
- High school: Cameron County (Emporium, Pennsylvania)
- College: Bucknell (2015–2019); Kentucky (2019–2020)
- NBA draft: 2020: undrafted
- Playing career: 2021–present

Career history
- 2021: Long Island Nets
- 2021: Hapoel Holon
- 2021–2022: Merkezefendi
- 2022–2023: Türk Telekom
- 2023–2024: Fenerbahçe
- 2024–2025: Valencia
- 2025–2026: Olimpia Milano
- 2026–present: ASVEL

Career highlights
- Turkish League champion (2024); Second-team All-Patriot League (2019)
- Stats at NBA.com
- Stats at Basketball Reference

Nathan Michael Sestina (born May 12, 1997) is an American-born naturalized Macedonian professional basketball player for ASVEL of the French LNB Élite and the EuroLeague. He played college basketball for the Bucknell Bison and Kentucky Wildcats.

== Early life ==
Sestina was born in St. Marys, Pennsylvania and grew up in Emporium, Pennsylvania. As a senior at Cameron County High School, Sestina averaged 22.6 points and 14 rebounds per game and was named the North Tier Conference Player of the Year. He finished high school with 1,703 points and 955 rebounds, a school record. Sestina committed to play college basketball at Bucknell over offers from 11 other schools. He became the first Division I basketball player from PIAA District 9 since 1990.

== College career ==
Sestina suffered a season-ending shoulder injury four games into his freshman year and used a medical redshirt. He averaged 4.8 points and 3.7 rebounds per game over 31 games as a reserve player during his sophomore year. As a junior, Sestina averaged 6.5 points and 3.9 rebounds and 14.9 minutes played per game. He became a starter going into his senior year and enjoyed a breakout season, averaging 15.8 points (6th in the Patriot League) and 8.5 rebounds per game (2nd in conference) and was named to the second team All-Patriot League. Following the end of the season, Sestina entered the transfer portal for his final season of eligibility as a graduate transfer. He was ranked the third-best player in the transfer portal by ESPN. Sestina committed to transfer to the University of Kentucky.

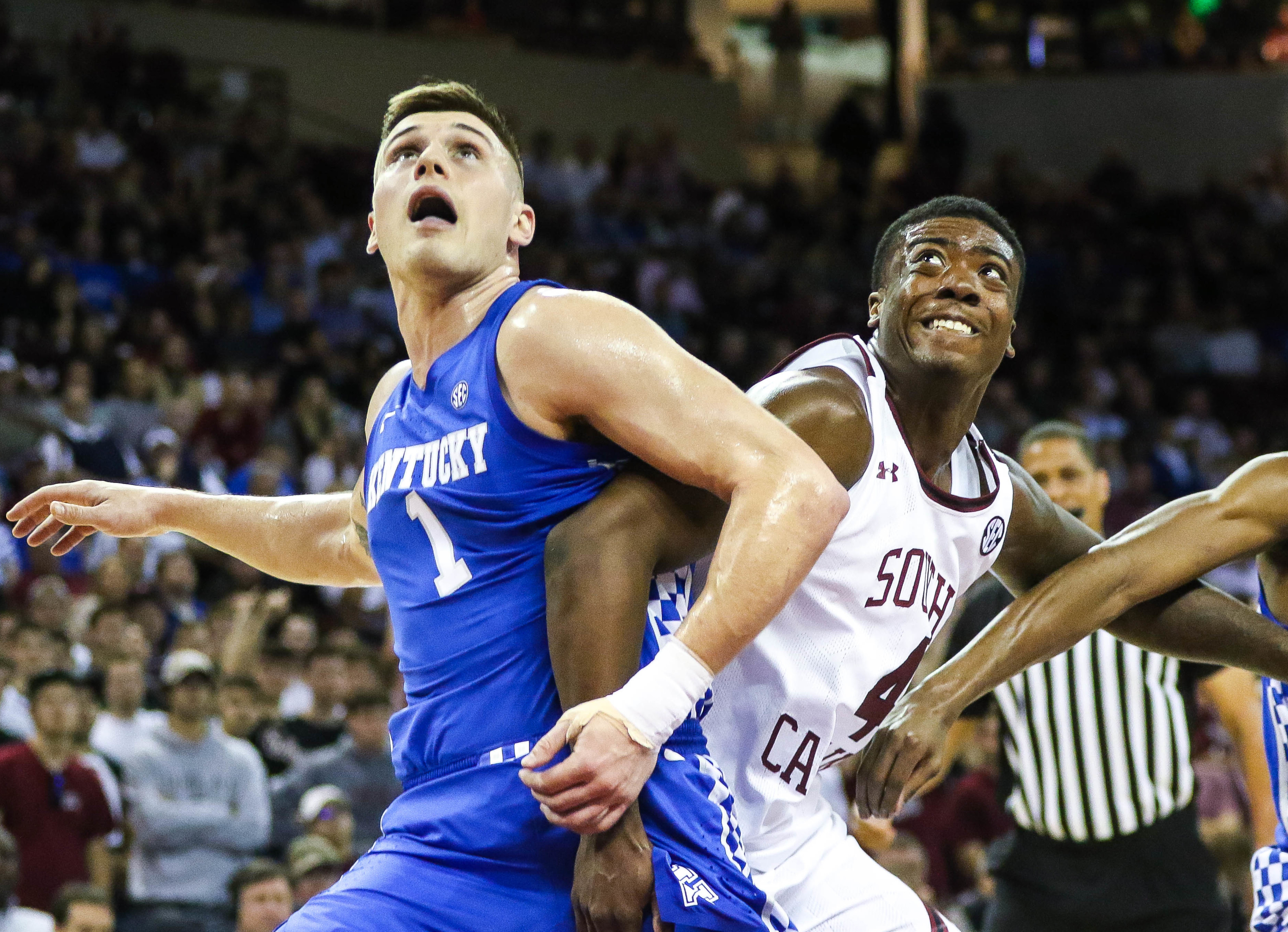
Sestina angling for a rebound in 2020

In his first game with the Wildcats, Sestina scored seven points and grabbed a team-high six rebounds in a 69–62 win over top-ranked Michigan State and hit a key three-point shot in the second half. He broke his left wrist six games into the season against Lamar, causing him to miss four weeks and three games. Sestina was averaging 7.3 points and 7.2 rebounds per game in 27.8 minutes of play at the time of the injury. Sestina returned in a game against Utah on December 18 and was scoreless. In the next game versus Ohio State, Sestina scored a season-high 17 points in a 71–65 Kentucky loss. He scored his 1,000th career point during a 13-point game against LSU on February 18, 2020. Sestina averaged 5.8 and 3.8 rebounds per game in 28 games and was named to the Southeastern Conference Community Service Team.

== Professional career ==
=== Long Island Nets (2021) ===
On July 30, 2020, Sestina signed his first professional contract with Kyiv-Basket of the Ukrainian SuperLeague. On October 13, he signed with Nizhny Novgorod of the VTB United League. However, with the season being cancelled, Sestina was released on November 3, before playing an official game for the team.

After going undrafted in the 2020 NBA draft, Sestina signed an Exhibit 10 contract for with the Brooklyn Nets on December 1, 2020. He was waived by the Nets on December 11. He was added to the roster of the Nets' NBA G League affiliate, the Long Island Nets.

=== Hapoel Holon (2021) ===
On March 15, 2021, he signed with Hapoel Holon of the Israeli Basketball Premier League.

=== Merkezefendi (2021–2022) ===
On July 8, 2021, he signed with Merkezefendi Belediyesi Denizli Basket of the Turkish Basketbol Süper Ligi (BSL).

=== Türk Telekom (2022–2023) ===
On June 22, 2022, Sestina signed with Türk Telekom of the Turkish BSL. On June 21, 2023, he mutually parted ways with the club.

=== Fenerbahçe (2023–2024) ===
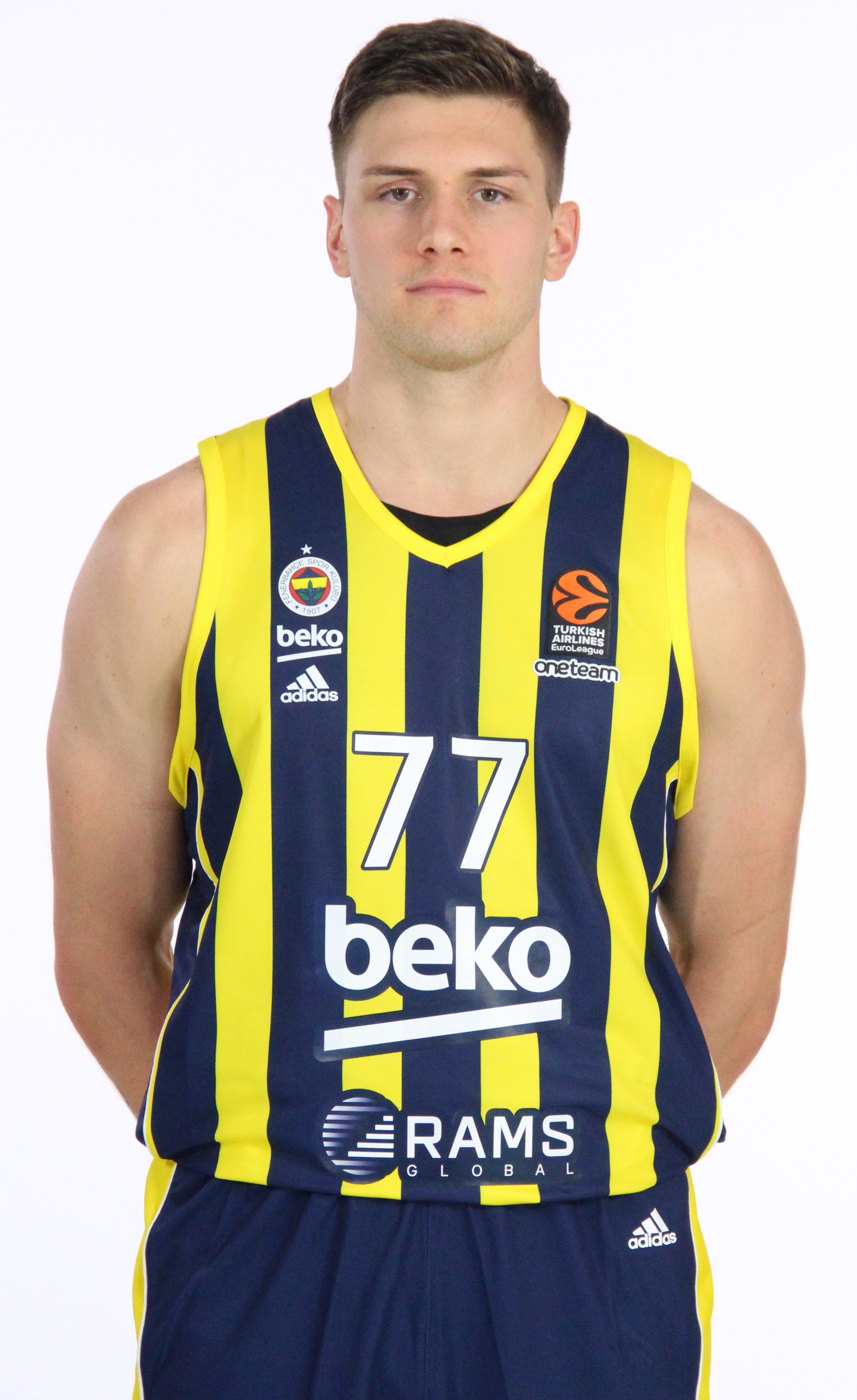
Sestina with Fenerbahçe in 2023

On July 14, 2023, Sestina signed a two-year (1+1) deal with Turkish powerhouse Fenerbahçe.

=== Valencia Basket (2024–2025) ===
On June 18, 2024, he signed with Valencia of the Spanish Liga ACB.

=== Olimpia Milano (2025–2026) ===
On October 20, 2025, he signed with Olimpia Milano of the Lega Basket Serie A (LBA).

=== ASVEL (2026–present) ===
On August 12, 2026, Sestina signed a one-year contract with LDLC ASVEL of the French LNB Élite and the EuroLeague.

== Career statistics ==
Legend
GP	Games played	GS	Games started	MPG	Minutes per game
FG%	Field-goal percentage	3P%	3-point field-goal percentage	FT%	Free-throw percentage
RPG	Rebounds per game	APG	Assists per game	SPG	Steals per game
BPG	Blocks per game	PPG	Points per game	PIR	Performance index rating
**Bold**	Career high

=== EuroLeague ===
Year	Team	GP	GS	MPG	FG%	3P%	FT%	RPG	APG	SPG	BPG	PPG	PIR
2023–24	Fenerbahçe	35	4	11.5	.465	.385	.588	1.5	.4	.3	.2	3.6	2.9
Career		35	4	11.5	.465	.385	.588	1.5	.4	.3	.2	3.6	2.9

=== EuroCup ===
Year	Team	GP	GS	MPG	FG%	3P%	FT%	RPG	APG	SPG	BPG	PPG	PIR
2022–23	Türk Telekom	22	6	26.7	.442	.372	.844	4.6	1.0	.5	.3	10.4	9.0
Career		22	6	26.7	.442	.372	.844	4.6	1.0	.5	.3	10.4	9.0

=== Domestic leagues ===
Year	Team	League	GP	MPG	FG%	3P%	FT%	RPG	APG	SPG	BPG	PPG
2020–21	(United States) Long Island Nets	G League	15	19.8	.394	.325	.667	2.7	.7	.3	.3	7.7
2020–21	(Israel) Hapoel Holon	Ligat HaAl	14	24.3	.505	.400	.810	3.6	.9	.7	.3	10.4
2020–21	(Israel) Hapoel Holon	BIBL	5	27.0	.491	.345	.900	5.0	1.6	1.0	.8	16.8
2021–22	(Turkey) M. B. Denizli	TBSL	30	26.5	.465	.455	.824	4.4	1.3	.3	.4	9.9
2022–23	(Turkey) Türk Telekom	TBSL	36	23.9	.496	.445	.774	3.4	.8	.5	.7	10.8
2023–24	(Turkey) Fenerbahçe	TBSL	18	23.9	.468	.427	.733	5.1	1.1	.7	.3	9.6

=== College ===
Year	Team	GP	GS	MPG	FG%	3P%	FT%	RPG	APG	SPG	BPG	PPG
2015–16	Bucknell	4	0	8.0	.545	**.667**	**1.000**	1.3	.8	**.5**	.0	3.8
2016–17	Bucknell	31	1	12.0	.508	.292	.696	3.7	.4	.2	.5	4.8
2017–18	Bucknell	**34**	0	14.9	**.560**	.341	.744	3.9	.9	.3	.6	6.5
2018–19	Bucknell	31	**31**	**27.8**	.536	.380	.808	**8.5**	**1.2**	.4	**1.1**	**15.8**
2019–20	Kentucky	28	7	19.8	.463	.407	.750	3.8	.8	.4	.6	5.8
Career		128	39	18.2	.525	.374	.773	4.9	.8	.3	.7	8.1

== Personal life ==
Sestina's father, Donald is a former teacher, basketball coach and athletic director for Cameron County High School and his mother, Rachelle, is also a teacher and swam collegiately at Indiana University of Pennsylvania. He has four siblings and his two older brothers, Andrew and Jason, both served in the U.S. Marine Corps.

Sestina is engaged to former Kentucky volleyball player and current Kentucky assistant volleyball coach Madison Lilley.
