= Hila Elmalich =

Israeli fashion model (1973–2007)

Hila Elmalich הילה אלמליח
- Born: Ilanit Hila Elmalich; 14 November 1973; Tiberias, Israel
- Died: 14 November 2007 (aged 34)
- Cause of death: Heart failure from anorexia nervosa
- Occupation: Model
- Years active: 1986–2007
- Modeling information
- Hair color: Brown
- Eye color: Blue
- Agency: Elite

Hila Ilanit Elmalich (Hebrew: הילה אילנית אלמליח; 14 November 1973 – 14 November 2007) was an Israeli fashion model who died of anorexia in 2007. Represented by the Israeli branch of the Elite Model Management modeling agency, she was once a famous fashion model in the country.

== Death ==
On November 14, 2007, on her 34th birthday, Elmalich died weighing less than 60 pounds (27 kg) after years of suffering from anorexia nervosa. She had been hospitalized several times due to the condition. She finally succumbed to it, collapsing and dying in her home due to heart failure.

== Campaign for a minimum BMI for models ==
Immediately after her death, Israeli fashion photographer Adi Barkan called her a "sacrifice to fashion". He initiated a worldwide campaign to "change the definition of beauty by encouraging models not to be skinny". Barkan's concern over Elmalich's death led to new body weight and body mass index requirements in Israel in 2012. These requirements do not allow modeling agencies to hire any models who have a BMI (body mass index) less than 18.5, below which is considered underweight. This law means a 5'9" woman would have to weigh at least 125 pounds in order to be hired. This is supposed to encourage models to not be so thin and release the pressure for women to continually lose weight.

== See also ==
- List of deaths from anorexia nervosa
