= Elk County Catholic High School =

Location
- 600 Maurus Street; St. Marys, (Elk County), Pennsylvania 15857; United States; 41°25′38″N 78°34′20″W

Information
- Type: Private, coeducational
- Religious affiliation: Roman Catholic
- Established: 1962
- President: Nick Chamberlin
- Principal: John Schneider
- Chaplain: Fr.Chris Barron
- Faculty: 27
- Grades: 9-12
  - Grade 9: 65
  - Grade 10: 74
  - Grade 11: 85
  - Grade 12: 66
- Average class size: 19
- Colors: Maroon and gold
- Athletics conference: PIAA District 9
- Team name: Crusaders
- Accreditation: Middle States Association of Colleges and Schools
- Publication: Expressions (literary magazine)
- Newspaper: Elk Catholic Corner
- Yearbook: Memories
- Tuition: $3,645
- Athletic Director: Aaron Straub
- Website: http://www.eccss.org

Elk County Catholic High School is a private, Roman Catholic high school in St. Marys, Pennsylvania, United States. It is located in the Roman Catholic Diocese of Erie.

== Background ==
Elk County Catholic High School was established in 1962 by the Catholic Diocese of Erie, Pennsylvania. The predecessor to ECCHS was the Central Catholic High School, located nearby on Church and Center Streets.

On March 24, 2006 the boys' basketball team, The Crusaders, won the PIAA Class A boy's basketball state championship by defeating Scranton's Bishop Hannan 71-61. The Crusaders were the only undefeated team in PIAA that year.

== Athletics ==
The school's colors are maroon and gold, and the mascot is the Crusader.
