= Strobel =

Strobel or Ströbel is a German surname. Notable people with the surname include:

- Allie Strobel (1884–1955), American baseball player
- Andreas Strobel (born 1972), German ski mountaineer and mountain biker
- Art Strobel (1922–1991), Canadian hockey player
- Aron Strobel (born 1958), German musician
- Bartholomeus Strobel (1591–c. 1647), German-Polish Baroque painter
- Edward Henry Strobel, United States diplomat
- Eric Strobel (born 1958), American ice hockey player
- Gabriel Strobel (1846–1925), Austrian priest and entomologist
- Gary Strobel (born 1938), American microbiologist
- Greg Strobel, American wrestling coach
- Heinrich Strobel (1898-1970), German musicologist
- Käte Strobel (1907–1996), German politician and minister
- Lee Strobel (born 1952), American author
- Margaret Strobel (born 1946), US academic
- Mike Strobel (born 1955), Canadian journalist
- Pellegrino Strobel (1821–1895), Italian zoologist
- Scott Strobel Yale Professor
- Sebastian Ströbel (born 1977), German film and TV actor
- Henriette Strobel (born 1953), German-Dutch singer and model as well as wife of Wolfgang Heichel

Fictional characters:

- Mark Strobel, a Chris Farley character on Saturday Night Live

== See also ==
- 1628 Strobel, a main-belt asteroid
- Strobl
