= Abergil crime family =

Israeli organized crime group

Abergil Organization
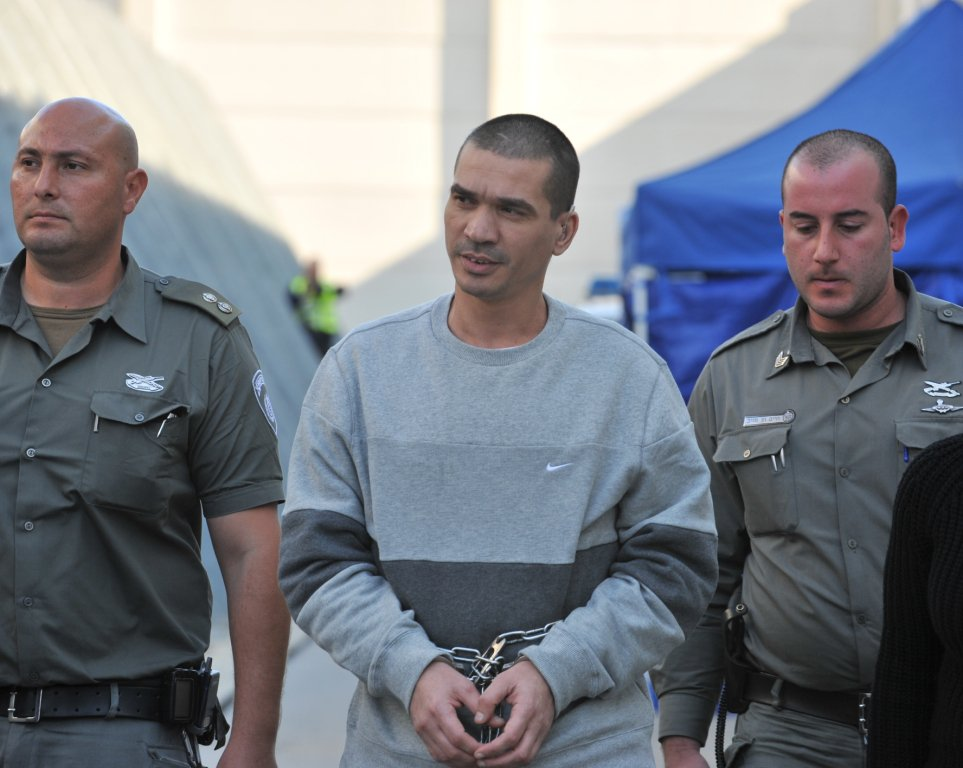
- Itzhak Abergil, center, escorted by Israeli forces at Ben Gurion airport, Israel, 12 January 2011
- Founded by: Yaakov and Itzhak Abergil
- Territory: Mainly Tel Aviv, but also throughout Israel, the United States and other countries.
- Ethnicity: Moroccan Jews
- Criminal activities: Drug trafficking, embezzlement, extortion, gambling, loansharking, money laundering, murder, and racketeering.
- Allies: Vineland Boys
- Rivals: Mexican Mafia; Alperon crime organization
- Notable members: Yaakov Abergil, Avi Abergil, Itzhak Abergil, Meir Abergil, Moti Hassin

The Abergil organization is an Israeli organized crime syndicate that has been active since the late 20th and early 21st centuries. The organization was founded by brothers Yaakov, Avi and Itzhak Abergil, of Moroccan Jewish origin, in the city of Ramat Gan, Israel, in the 1990s. The Abergil Organization is involved in a wide range of criminal activities, including drug trafficking, money laundering, and extortion.

In the early 2000s, the Abergil Organization was targeted by law enforcement agencies in Israel and the United States. In 2005, Yaakov Abergil was arrested in Israel and extradited to the United States, where he was convicted of drug trafficking and sentenced to 32 years in prison. Avi Abergil was also arrested in Israel in 2008 and extradited to the United States, where he was charged with drug trafficking and money laundering. He ultimately pleaded guilty and was sentenced to 10 years in prison. In 2021, Itzhak Abergil was convicted—along with others in the organization—of three acts of murder, heading a crime organization, and other crimes; the following year he was sentenced to three life sentences in prison and an additional 30 years in prison.

== Operations ==
=== Assets ===
According to the Israeli Police, the Abergil Organization, at its height in June 2004, had tens of millions of shekels in assets in Israel. The organization ran 37 companies, owned 38 apartments and 56 cars.

=== Money-laundering ===
According to the indictment, the crime organization headed by Itzhak and Meir Abergil ran a flourishing money-laundering business in the US from 2002 to 2006, processing tens of millions of US dollars of funds embezzled from the Israel Trade Bank, through the “Jerusalem Gang′s” extortion of Ofer Maximov, that led to his sister Etti Alon's embezzling 250 million shekel. The money was given out as loans to Israeli businesspeople in the United States, who were later extorted to give up their businesses if they did not pay up. Meir Abergil, described as the person in charge of finances, collected the money that was exacted and later laundered and invested it. Gabi Ben Harosh of the “Jerusalem Gang” who was arrested in Los Angeles in 2004, ran the lending bank in the United States and updated Meir and Itzhak Abergil on its balance. Sasson Barashi of Jerusalem and Hai Vaknin of Los Angeles identified borrowers and businesses and also saw to the collection of the money. Yoram Elal, who has fled to Brazil, was responsible for special-operations. The activities have been documented in hundreds of surveillance reports, photographs and phone calls, which were recorded by police departments all over the world and are detailed in the indictment.

=== Drug trafficking ===
The US State Department considers the Abergils as one of the world's top 40 drug importers to the US. US federal prosecutors claim that when the Abergils wished to expand their mob syndicate in the US, they turned for help to an upstart Latino street gang known as the Vineland Boys. The Boys' feud with the Mexican Mafia, known as "La Eme", sent the Boys looking for a new source of drugs, which the Israelis provided. The Abergils, along with Moshe Malul and Israel Ozifa, are also charged with smuggling cocaine and hashish from Europe to the United States.

On 22 July 2002, the Los Angeles Police busted a meeting of ecstasy dealers in the midst of a drug and money exchange, confiscating over 400,000 tablets of the drug, valued at more than $5 million. According to the LAPD, Moshe Malul was the person behind the distribution of millions of ecstasy tablets in Southern California and Itzhak Abergil the person responsible for the ecstasy shipments from Belgium and the Netherlands.

In May 2008, a court in Antwerp sentenced Itzhak Abergil along with eight other accomplices to a firm 5-year prison term for his involvement in large scale drug trafficking through the city of Antwerp's port.

=== Personal safety ===
In June 2002, Yaakov Abergil, the eldest of the brothers, was murdered in front of his family. After his death, the leadership passed on to his brother Itzhak, who has accumulated a number of powerful enemies and survived several assassination attempts. In December 2002, one of Abergil's main rivals, underworld kingpin Ze'ev Rosenstein, was arrested on suspicion of conspiring to assassinate both Abergils. In 2007, Police learned that at least two contract killers, believed to be from the Commonwealth of Independent States, had come to Israel at the behest of a rival crime family embroiled in a vendetta with the Abergil crime syndicate. The police believed the two hit men to be hired by the competing Alperon crime family.

=== Murders and assassinations ===
The Abergils have been accused of a number of murders and assassinations.

On 31 August 2003, Sami Atias, an Israeli drug dealer who had belonged to an ecstasy ring headed by Abergil and Moshe Malul, was shot at close range and killed in the parking lot of an Encino café as he was getting into his car. Allegedly he had tried to steal 76 kilograms of ecstasy in 2002. According to the indictment, Moshe Malul and fugitive Vineland Boyz′ member Luis Sandoval, were at the scene when Atias was shot, but another man had pulled the trigger. Itzhak Abergil had offered to help with the slaying during a meeting in Spain, but he did not play a direct role in the killing.

On 5 October 2008, Amir Sanker and Eitan Gerella, two suspected associates of the Abergil crime family, were acquitted of a charge of grievous bodily harm by a Tel Aviv District Court, instead being convicted of lesser crimes, due to police negligence in collecting evidence. The charge sheet had claimed that the suspects had planned to kill Nissim Alperon, brother of crime boss Yaakov Alperon in retaliation for an attack on Itzhak Abergil said to be carried out by the Alperons five months earlier. In November 2008, Yaakov Alperon was killed in a car blast in Tel Aviv.

In 2005, two girls were killed in Ramle by shots fired at a hall where Itzhak Abergil was celebrating. Police believe the slain girls were innocent victims of a mistake by the attacker in identifying his true target.

In August 2008 31-year-old social worker Margarita Lautin (Hebrew: מרגריטה לאוטין), from Yehud, was killed while dining on the Bat Yam boardwalk with her husband and two young children. The targets of the shooting, attempting to run away from the shooters, had created a clear line of fire on Lautin, who was shot in the chest. The two suspected assassins, Ronen Ben-Adi and Shimon Sabah, members of the Abergil mob, fled the scene on a motorcycle, but were later apprehended by the police. They were convicted in May 2010, Sabah was sentenced to prison for seven years, and Ben Adi to life in prison and required to pay Lautin's daughters NIS 350,000 in compensation.

The assailants were apparently targeting Rami Amira, who was sitting at a table nearby with Moti Hassin and Simantov Mahtayeb, who are all identified with the Abergil group, in an effort to resolve an internal dispute. Amira sustained a slight injury in his cheek as a result of the attack. He was killed on 2 February 2011 in Rishon LeZion, presumably by the Abergil organization which, according to police sources, continued to operate while the two Abergil brothers were extradited and awaiting trial in the United States.

== Arrests and extradition ==
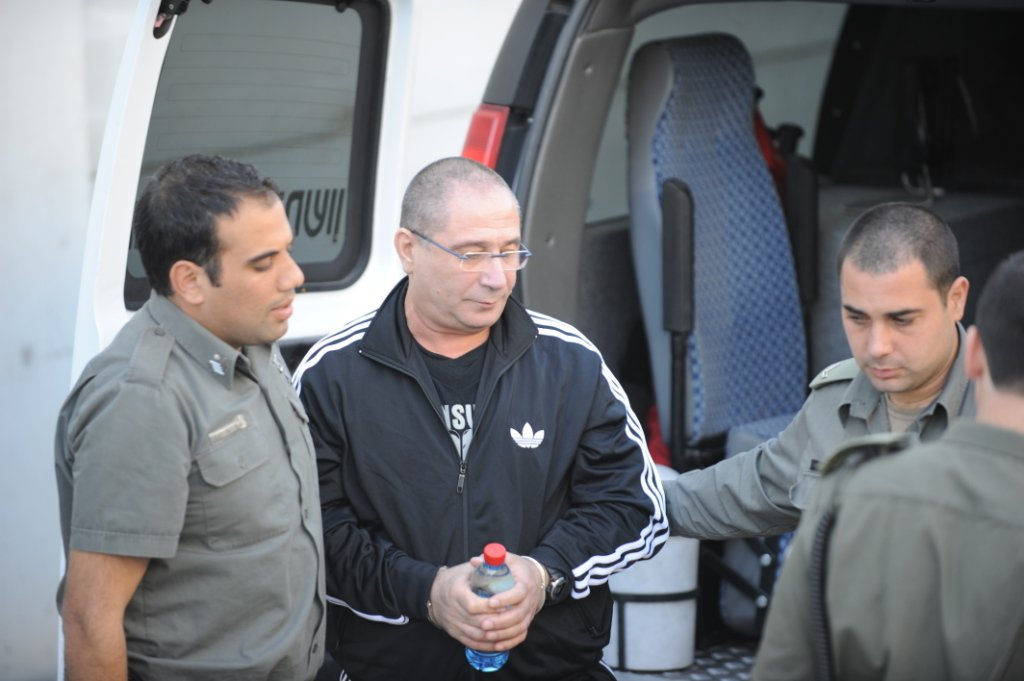
Meir Abergil, 12 January 2011

In 2004, Gabi Ben Harosh, partner of the Abergil brothers, was arrested in Los Angeles. After two years of house arrest, he signed a plea bargain for minor offenses, connected to bringing in foreign currency without a permit, and was sentenced to community service and judicial supervision for three years. In view of the Abergil brothers extradition to the US, he and his wife were arrested for violating immigration laws. It is believed that American authorities tried to apply pressure to Ben Harosh to incriminate the Abergil brothers but failed.

Hai Vaknin, called an “Abergil henchman” by the Israeli daily Haaretz, was arrested in the US in 2006. In January 2011, he signed a plea bargain, confessing to money laundering and receiving a 57-month prison sentence, which he had already served, and was ordered to serve three years under supervised release.

In early August 2008, Itzhak and Meir Abergil were arrested on suspicion of involvement in the murder of Margarita Lautin who had died after being mistakenly shot during a failed assassination attempt by members of the Abergil mob.

On 26 August 2008, Itzhak and Meir Abergil along with Moshe Malul and Israel Ozifa were brought before a Jerusalem Magistrate's Court judge for their alleged role in the killing of Israeli drug dealer Sami Atias in Encino in August 2003, as a revenge for his allegedly having stolen money from them. They were remanded in custody together with Sason Barashi as a result of a request by law enforcement in the United States for their extradition. The indictment includes four different crimes that are attributed to Yitzhak Abergil: involvement together with Malul in the murder of Atias in California in 2003, trade in Ecstasy, extortion and violence against businessmen, and money laundering and fraud. The inquiry into the case had lasted for six years, involving the FBI, tax authorities and law enforcement officials in more than ten countries in America, Europe, Asia and the Middle East.

In July 2009, a Jerusalem District Court approved the state's request to extradite the Abergils, Sasson Barashy, Moshe Malul and Israel Ozifa to the US. In December 2010, the Supreme Court rejected an appeal by the three associates of the Abergil brothers.

On 12 January 2011, Itzhak and Meir Abergil, together with Sasson Barashy, Moshe Malul and Israel Ozifa, were extradited to the US, arriving in Los Angeles on January 13, aboard an American government airplane. They were being held in the Metropolitan Detention Center in downtown Los Angeles, facing a 77-page, 32-count federal indictment that alleges murder, massive embezzlement, money laundering, racketeering and running a large Los Angeles-based Ecstasy ring. The trial was set for 8 November 2011 in the Los Angeles Federal District Court. If convicted, they may face life imprisonment, but not the death penalty, as US authorities have promised their Israeli counterparts that even if found guilty of murder, the five suspects would not be given the death penalty. Under the terms of the extradition agreement, they would likely serve their sentence in an Israeli prison. Shortly after the extradition, a threatening letter was found under the car of the wife of the Prosecutor who was involved in the extradition.

Despite evidence, Itzhak Abergil called the allegations “police provocation” during an earlier custody hearing, further stating that he had never been to the United States. In an interview on Israeli television, Meir Abergil dismissed claims that he and his brother were important criminals, saying: “Who are we? We're peanuts compared to the mafias they have in America ... Who are we? Nothing, cockroaches.”

== After the extradition ==
According to Israeli police sources, the Abergil crime organization has continued to operate in Israel after Itzhak Abergil and his brother Meir were arrested. The Israeli Police reportedly believe that Moti Hassin, a reputed senior member of the Abergil group, took the reins of the organization after the Abergil brothers were extradited to the US. In March 2012, Hassin and three alleged accomplices were arrested on suspicion of being responsible for two gangland hits carried out in the Tel Aviv area, the killings of Avi David, who was shot dead at point-blank range by a motorcyclist outside a Bat Yam steakhouse in October 2011, and Itzik Geffen, who died in a hail of gunfire at a gas station in Holon two months later. In February 2013, the police arrested three men suspected of taking part in the murder of Sharon Mizrachi, who was shot to death while sitting in his car in Bat Yam. According to the police, the main motive for the killings was the victim's intention to join a rival crime gang, and were ordered by Hassin partly to establish his position as the new leader of the crime family.

In early May 2012, five alleged members of the Abergil organization who were suspected of conspiring to commit a crime and possessing deadly weapons were arrested in Jerusalem, after police had found a weapons cache inside a storage room in an apartment building in Jerusalem where one of the suspects' parents live. According to the suspects, they followed the advice of Itzhak Abergil to hide weapons in public buildings in order to deflect suspicion from the organization. At the suspects’ homes police discovered signs of violence, including ceramic bulletproof vests with bullet holes in them. The police suspects that the organization was planning a major attack. According to the suspects, they were planning to take revenge on a Jerusalem resident, who owed the organization money.

== Plea agreements ==
In August 2011, Meir Abergil was freed and returned to Israel after having served about three years in prison first in Israel and then in the United States. Charged with blackmailing U.S. businessmen to whom the brothers had lent money, he allegedly had played a relatively minor role in the crimes and is thought to have been involved mainly in the extortion of Asi Vaknin, who was arrested in Mexico and brought to the United States in April 2011, but refuses to testify against the Abergils. As a result, U.S. authorities reportedly were not able to build a case against Meir Abergil, leading to a plea agreement approved by a California court in which Abergil confessed to extortion of over a million dollars from another mob figure. In Israel, he faces criminal charges pending against him in the district court in Petah Tikva over allegations regarding his involvement in an Internet gambling business set up about 10 years ago which operated in many locations in Israel, including Internet cafes, convenience stores, soccer lottery outlets and nightclubs functioning as casinos. According to his lawyer, Abergil's involvement in the alleged activities was marginal.

In May 2012, Itzhak Abergil pleaded guilty in a Los Angeles federal court to being part of a racketeering enterprise that distributed Ecstasy and whose members killed Sami Atias for stealing a large drug shipment. On 21 May 2012, he was sentenced to ten years in prison, including the length of his detention in the US, leaving eight and a half years for him to serve. He was also ordered to serve three years under supervised release after his release from prison. His lawyers called it "a good deal," according to them, Abergil was facing the risk of getting a life sentence. He is to serve his time in Israel.

Moshe Malul pleaded guilty to a charge of racketeering conspiracy, admitting to conspiracy to commit murder and conspiracy to import the drug Ecstasy to the U.S. In his plea agreement, he acknowledged that as part of the Abergil crime family, he hired members of the Vineland Boyz street gang based in North Hollywood, to kill Sami Atias in retaliation for stealing Ecstasy that belonged to the Abergil organization. He was sentenced to 15 years in prison on 21 June 2012 with credit for time served. He was also ordered to serve three years under supervised release after his release from federal prison.

Israel Ozifa pleaded guilty to a charge of conspiracy to import Ecstasy pills from Belgium into the United States. He was sentenced to eight years in federal prison on 18 July 2012, with credit for time served. He was also ordered to serve three years under supervised release after his release from federal prison. According to the prosecution, Ozifa was an "important, trusted and, most important, productive member" of the organization, while Ozifa's attorney said his client was "really the running dog" of the Abergil family and only followed orders.

On 8 January 2013, Sasson Barashy was found guilty of racketeering conspiracy and was sentenced to four and a half years in prison with credit for time served. He was also ordered to serve three years under supervised release after his release from federal prison.

On 16 November 2021, Itzhak Abergil was convicted by the Tel Aviv District Court - along with others in the organization - of three acts of murder, heading a crime organization, and other crimes. This was one of the largest criminal trials in the history of the State of Israel, known as "case 512". On 28 June 2022 Abergil was sentenced to three life sentences in prison and an additional 30 years in prison.
