= WKBI (AM) =

Coordinates: 41°24′56″N 78°33′56″W

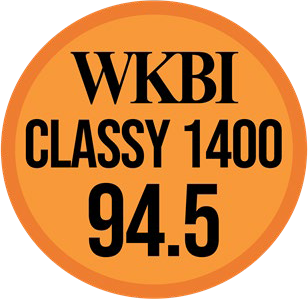
- Saint Marys, Pennsylvania; United States
- Frequency: 1400 kHz
- Branding: News Talk 1400 & 94.5

Programming
- Format: Adult standards
- Affiliations: America's Best Music

Ownership
- Owner: Dennis and Rose Heindl; (Laurel Media, Inc.)
- Sister stations: WKBI-FM, WDDH

History
- First air date: July 23, 1950

Technical information
- Licensing authority: FCC
- Facility ID: 65603
- Class: C
- Power: 1,000 watts
- Translator: 94.5 W233BS (St. Marys)

Links
- Public license information: Public file; LMS
- Website: wkbiradio.com

WKBI, known as "Classy 1400 & 94.5", is an adult standards formatted radio station based in Saint Marys, Pennsylvania. WKBI is the only AM radio station in Elk County. In 2013, the station came under the ownership of Laurel Media, Inc., owners of WDDH.

== History ==
WKBI was the very first radio station in Elk County, and as there was no radio station on the air in neighboring Cameron County at the time, the station's licensee was initially known as Elk-Cameron Broadcasting. Neighboring Forest County also did not have (and still doesn't have) a local radio station of its own. Cameron County did not receive its own radio station until WLEM first signed on the air on March 2, 1958 followed by its same-named FM sister station 27 years later.

WKBI remains the sole AM radio station in all of Elk County. In its earliest years, WKBI was the flagship station of Allegheny Mountain Network (AMN), first having signed on the air July 23, 1950, and was thus the first station in the group. That changed five years later, when AMN founder Cary H. Simpson signed on WTRN in Tyrone. Operations for the AMN were then moved to Tyrone.

WKBI gained an FM sister station in 1966, which became known as WKBI-FM. That station is known today as B94.

WKBI's original studio location was in the Mullendean Hotel, next to the G.C. Murphy Co. The hotel was torn down in the mid '60s to expand Murphy's, and the studio was moved to a location above the Firestone tire store. In the early 1970s, WKBI-AM-FM moved to a new building constructed at the station's transmitter site on Melody Lane, located just outside the St. Mary's city limits, where it remained until its sale to its present owners.

The Allegheny Mountain Network was dismantled over the course of the late 2000s; with WKBI being sold to Laurel Media (owners of WDDH) in late 2012 as part of the dismantling. The sale was consummated on January 31, 2013 at a purchase price of $766,047 for both WKBI and sister station WKBI-FM.

On June 4, 2019, WKBI changed their format from adult standards to news/talk, branded as "News Talk 1400 & 94.5".

WKBI operates a translator on 94.5 with the call sign W233BS-FM 250 watts output.

As of 2026, the station has returned to its previous branding as Classy 1400 and affiliated with America's Best Music.
