= Wolfgang Straub =

Swiss lawyer and photographer (born 1969)

Wolfgang Straub (born 1969, in Waiblingen) is a Swiss lawyer and photographer.

== Photographic works ==
His series of still lifes ‘Le dictionnaire des analphabètes’ deal with visual evidence of the paradoxical.

His 'Enchanted Gardens' series deals with conveying an emotional content by means of altering forms of expression.

Straub's works are present in several public and private collections.

== Photographic publications ==
Enchanted Gardens, Wyss Bern/Museum Franz Gertsch Burgdorf 2010, ISBN 978-3-033-02263-8 and ISBN 978-3-7285-2010-4

== Solo exhibitions ==
- 2009 Museum Franz Gertsch, Burgdorf
- 2010 Leica Gallery Switzerland, Biel
