= Liran Strauber =

Israeli footballer

Liran Strauber לירן שטראובר
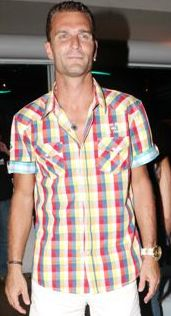
- Strauber in 2011

Personal information
- Full name: Liran Strauber
- Date of birth: 20 August 1974 (age 52)
- Place of birth: Yagel, Israel
- Height: 1.93 m (6 ft 4 in)
- Position: Goalkeeper

Youth career
- Hapoel Tel Aviv

Senior career*
Years	Team	Apps	(Gls)
1992–1993	Hapoel Tel Aviv	15	(0)
1993–1994	Hapoel Kiryat Ono		
1994–1995	Bnei Yehuda	29	(0)
1995–1996	Ironi Ashdod		
1996–1997	Bnei Yehuda	23	(0)
1997–1999	Hapoel Jerusalem	57	(0)
1999–2006	Maccabi Tel Aviv	199	(0)
2006–2009	Maccabi Netanya	96	(0)
2009–2011	Maccabi Tel Aviv	65	(0)
2011–2012	Maccabi Petah Tikva	30	(0)

International career^{‡}
1991	Israel U17	6	(0)
1993–1995	Israel U21	17	(0)
2002–2008	Israel	8	(0)
- * Club domestic league appearances and goals as of 21 December 2010 ‡ National team caps and goals as of 21 December 2010

Liran Strauber (or Shtrauber, Hebrew: לירן שטראובר; born 20 August 1974) is a former Israeli association footballer who played as a goalkeeper. At international level, Strauber was capped at under-17 and under-21, and played eight times for the senior Israel national team.

== Early and personal life ==
Strauber was born in moshav Yagel, Israel, to a family of Ashkenazi Jewish descent.

In 2006, he married former Likud parliament member of the Knesset, Inbal Gavrieli. The two divorced in 2009. In May 2011, he married Elinor Avigdol.

== Sports career ==
Strauber began his career in the youth club of Hapoel Tel Aviv and was promoted to the senior squad in 1992. Strauber remained in Hapoel Tel Aviv for one season before moving to Hapoel Kiryat Ono for one season too. At the next season Strauber was playing in Bnei Yehuda Tel Aviv where he stayed for one year. During playing in those three clubs Strauber was also the goalkeeper of the Israel national under-21 football team and had 17 international caps.

At the 1995/96 season Strauber was a player of Maccabi Ironi Ashdod before returning to Bnei Yehuda Tel Aviv for another season. The next season, he moved to Hapoel Jerusalem and played there for two seasons. After two seasons in Jerusalem Strauber moved to Maccabi Tel Aviv where he spent 7 seasons in his career and was one of the leading players in this club, winning the Israeli Championship once in 2002/03 and playing with the club in the UEFA Champions League and the UEFA Cup. During the 2005–06 season Strauber had disputes with the fans and management of Maccabi Tel Aviv, resulting in his transfer to Maccabi Netanya before the 2006–07 season. The club reached second place that season and qualified for the UEFA Cup qualifying rounds, for the first time in its history. Strauber managed to have a clean sheet for 783 minutes (9 games) from 8 December 2007 to 16 February 2008, which is a record in the history of Israeli football.

After three seasons in Maccabi Netanya he made his return to Maccabi Tel Aviv. He was Maccabi Tel Aviv's team captain. After a poor form in the last season of Maccabi Tel Aviv He left the club as a free agent and signed for Maccabi Petah Tikva.

He retired from football after getting relegated with Maccabi Petah Tikva to Liga Leumit.

Strauber made 513 appearances in the Israeli Premier League which puts him in the 6th place of the league's all-time table.

== Honours ==
=== Club ===
Bnei Yehuda

- Toto Cup Top Division: : 1996–97

Maccabi Tel Aviv

- Israeli Premier League: 2002–03
- State Cup: 2001, 2002, 2005

=== Individual ===
- Israeli Premier League Beast Goalkeeper of the Year: 2007–08

== See also ==
- Sports in Israel
