= Cameron County High School =

Coordinates: 41.513°N 78.247°W

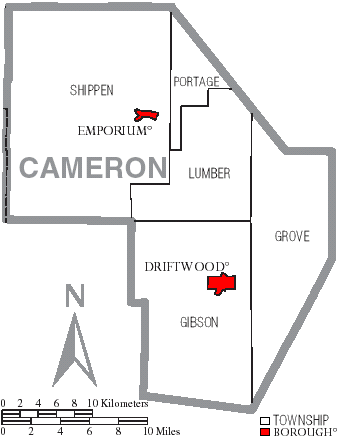
- Map of Cameron County, Pennsylvania

Location
- 601 Woodland Avenue; Emporium, Cameron, Pennsylvania 15834; United States

Information
- School type: Public Junior/Senior High School
- School district: Cameron County
- Superintendent: Keith Wolfe
- District Principal: Amy Schwab
- Teaching staff: 20.14 (FTE)
- Grades: 7-12
- Student to teacher ratio: 12.02
- Hours in school day: 7
- Colors: Red and White
- Athletics conference: PIAA District IX
- Team name: Red Raiders
- Communities served: Driftwood, Emporium
- Feeder schools: Woodland Elementary School
- Website: https://www.camcosd.org/high-school

Cameron County High School is an institution of secondary education in Emporium, Pennsylvania, and is the only high school in the Cameron County School District of rural Cameron County, Pennsylvania. There are about 400 students in grades 7 to 12 attending the school.

Its attendance boundary is that of the county.

== Graduation requirements ==
All students wishing to graduate from CCHS must complete the following coursework in grades 9-12 in order to receive a diploma:

- English - 4 credits
- Social Studies - 4 credits
- Science - 4 credits
- Math - 4 credits
- Physical Education - one course each year
- Health - one course in Grade 7 and 11
- Complete a senior project

== Athletics ==
CCHS participates in PIAA District IX.

Sport Name	Boys/Class	Girls/Class
Baseball	Class A	
Basketball	Class A	Class A
Football	Class A	
Golf	Class AAAA	Class AAAA
Softball		Class A
Track and Field	Class AA	Class AA
Volleyball		Class A
Wrestling	Class AA	

== Notable alumni ==
- Nate Sestina (born 1997), basketball player in the Israeli Basketball Premier League
