= St. Marys Municipal Airport =

- IATA: STQ; ICAO: KOYM; FAA LID: OYM

Summary
- Airport type: Public
- Owner: City of St. Marys
- Serves: St. Marys, Pennsylvania
- Elevation AMSL: 1,934 ft / 589 m
- Coordinates: 41°24′45″N 078°30′09″W
- Website: stmaryspa.gov
- Interactive map of St. Marys Municipal Airport

Runways
Direction	Length		Surface
Direction	ft	m	Surface
10/28	4,300	1,311	Asphalt/Treated

Statistics (2007)
- Aircraft operations: 6,730
- Based aircraft: 26
- Source: Federal Aviation Administration

St. Marys Municipal Airport (IATA: STQ, ICAO: KOYM, FAA LID: OYM) is a city-owned public airport in St. Marys, in Elk County, Pennsylvania.

Most U.S. airports use the same three-letter location identifier for the FAA and IATA, but St. Marys Municipal Airport is OYM to the FAA and STQ to the IATA.

== History ==
The concept for the airport was born on February 15, 1944: a committee was formed to begin work developing an airport. The site for the new airport along South Michael Road was approved in October, 1944.

St. Marys Borough Council accepted the airport project stipulating that no taxpayer money would be used to build, improve or operate the airport. Local industry, such as the local powdered metal manufacturers, strongly supported the airport since the beginning.

The airport opened on June 30, 1950 with a 3,700' x 75' runway. After the opening, the Hoffman residence was renovated into an administration building. In 1954 a runway rehabilitation extended the paved part of the runway to 2,400' was completed. Since then, millions of dollars in Federal, State, and local funds have been spent on the airport. In 1998 the airport completed a runway rehabilitation. The entire runway surface was replaced along with the repair and rehabilitation of the drainage system, lighting, taxiways, and the apron. In 1999 a large commercial hangar was built that is now used for minor repairs, overhauls, and repair. A new terminal and restaurant were recently built, and an airport industrial park. Victor Straub is the Chairman of the Airport Authority.

== Facilities ==
The airport covers 283 acres (115 ha). Its one runway, 10/28, is 4,300 x 75 ft (1,311 x 23 m) asphalt. In the year ending October 31, 2007 the airport had 6,730 aircraft operations, average 18 per day: 85% general aviation, 15% air taxi and <1% military. 26 aircraft were then based at the airport: 80% single-engine, 4% multi-engine, 8% helicopter and 8% ultralight.

== See also ==
- List of airports in Pennsylvania
