= Decker's Chapel =

- Decker
- U.S. National Register of Historic Places
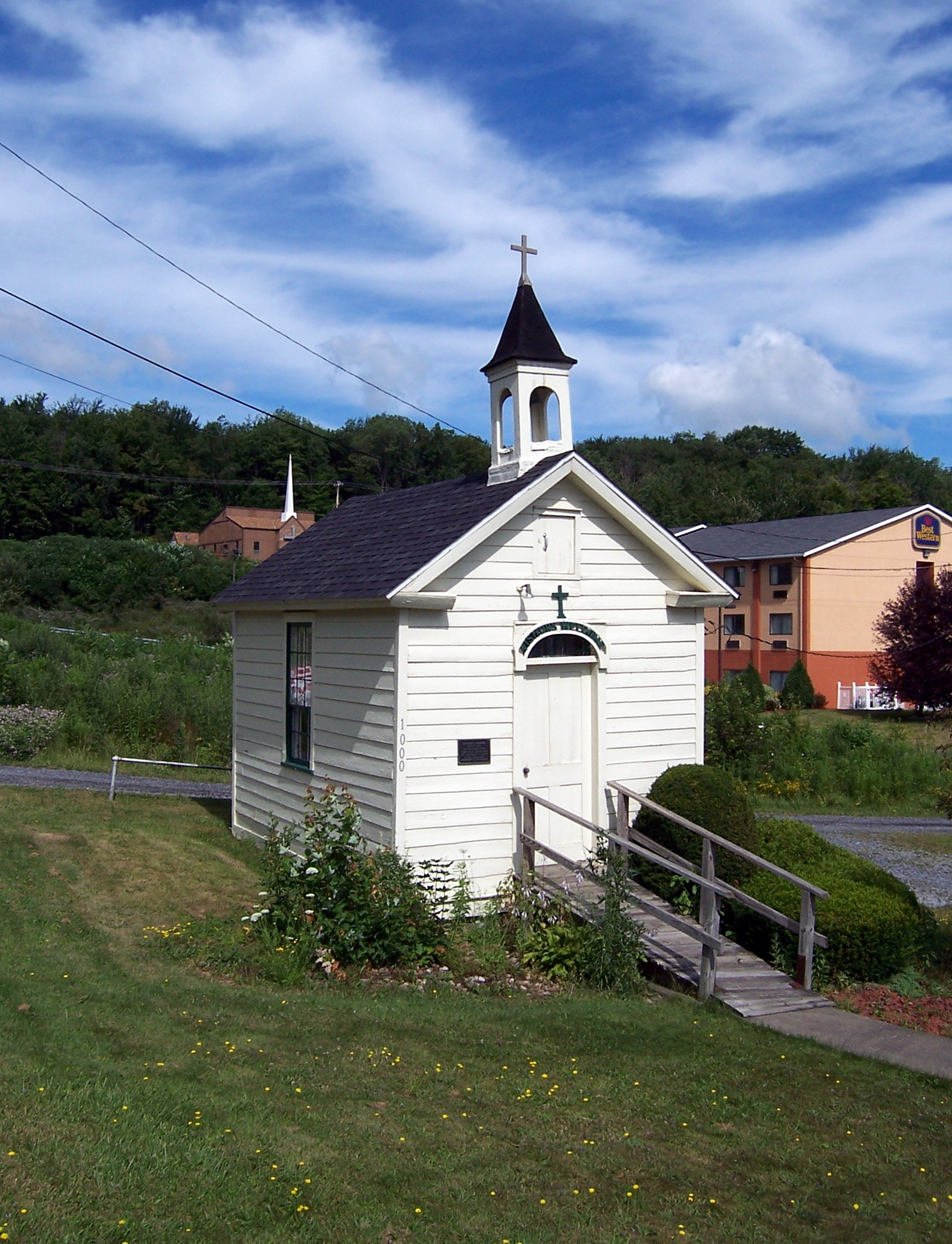
- Decker's Chapel, April 2010

- Location within Pennsylvania Location within the United States
- Location: Jct. Earth Rd. and PA 255, St. Marys, Pennsylvania
- Coordinates: 41°24′3″N 78°33′39″W
- Area: less than one acre
- Built: 1856
- Architect: Decker, Michael
- Architectural style: Greek Revival
- NRHP reference No.: 98001367
- Added to NRHP: November 12, 1998

Decker's Chapel is a historic chapel on Earth Road and PA 255 in St. Marys, Elk County, Pennsylvania within the Diocese of Erie.

== Description ==
It was built in 1856 and is a one-story gable-end oriented and clapboard clad wood-frame structure. It measures 12 feet by 18 feet and contains a single, plastered room. It features a rectangular steeple with an open belfry capped with a cross tipped, pyramidal roof. Also on the property is a granite commemorative marker dedicated in 1928 to Monsignor Michael Joseph Decker.

It was added to the National Register of Historic Places in 1998.

== Gallery ==
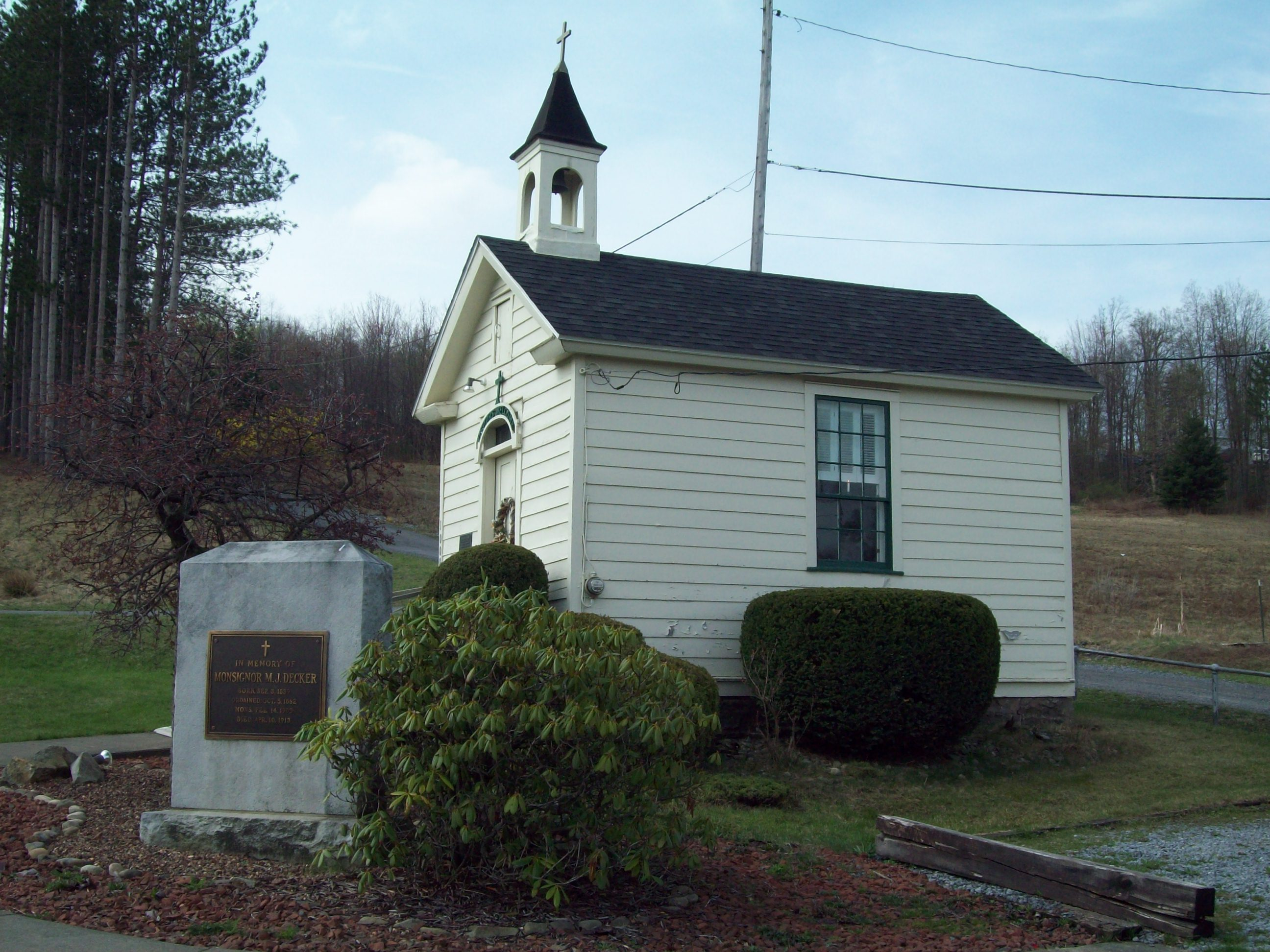
View showing marker dedicated in 1928 to Monsignor Michael Joseph Decker, April 2010
