= Straubinger =

Straubinger is a German language habitational surname for someone from Straubing. Notable people with the name include:

- Max Straubinger (1954), German politician
- Sybille Straubinger (1970), Austrian politician
