= Zeev Rosenstein =

Israeli drug trafficker

- זאב רוזנשטיין
- Born: 1954 (age 71–72); Tel Aviv, Israel
- Opponent: Abergil crime family

Zeev Rosenstein (Hebrew: זאב רוזנשטיין; born 1954) is an Israeli drug trafficker.

== Early life ==
Rosenstein was born in Jaffa to immigrant parents, a Romanian Jewish father and a Mountain Jewish mother. He never completed high school, and instead worked in an electronics store on Allenby Street in Tel Aviv until beginning his mandatory service in the Israel Defense Forces. Rosenstein served in Camp Rabin, but left the army before completing his full term of service.

== Criminal career ==
Rosenstein began his criminal career in his youth, starting with small break-ins. With the exception of a robbery conviction in the 1970s, police had never managed to gather sufficient evidence to indict Rosenstein.

On 11 December 2003, a bomb aimed at Rosenstein killed three people and injured 18 others in Tel Aviv. The bombing, which occurred during the peak of the Second Intifada, led to a media outcry against the Israeli mob families, with newspapers comparing them with the Intifada's Palestinian Militants in terms of threat to the Israeli state. Ariel Sharon called an emergency cabinet meeting and the government announced an extra 500 million shekels in the fight against organized crime. The bombing was the seventh attempt on the life of Rosenstein, who became known as the "wolf with seven lives", and was said to have been carried out by the Abergil crime family, which Rosenstein had been feuding with for several years.

== Arrest and trial ==
In November 2004, after 700,000 ecstasy tablets were seized in a Manhattan apartment, he was charged with distributing ecstasy in the United States in a joint effort of U.S. Department of Justice and Israeli Ministry of Justice.

After exhausting his legal options in Israel, a precedent-setting decision by the Supreme Court of Israel, extradited Rosenstein to the U.S. on 6 March 2006, making him one of very few Israelis to ever be extradited for prosecution in another country, especially the United States.

Rosenstein pleaded not guilty in U.S. court to the distribution of ecstasy and was sentenced to 12 years in prison. In accordance with the extradition treaty between Israel and the U.S., he was returned to Israel to serve his U.S.-imposed sentence in an Israeli prison. As part of his plea agreement in the U.S., he had confessed to having hired assassins to kill rival mafia leaders in Israel, which he had previously denied. As a result, upon his return to Israel he was charged with conspiracy to murder. He reached a plea bargain, and was sentenced to an additional five years in prison.
