= St. Marys, Pennsylvania =

City in Pennsylvania, US

Saint Marys, Pennsylvania
- City
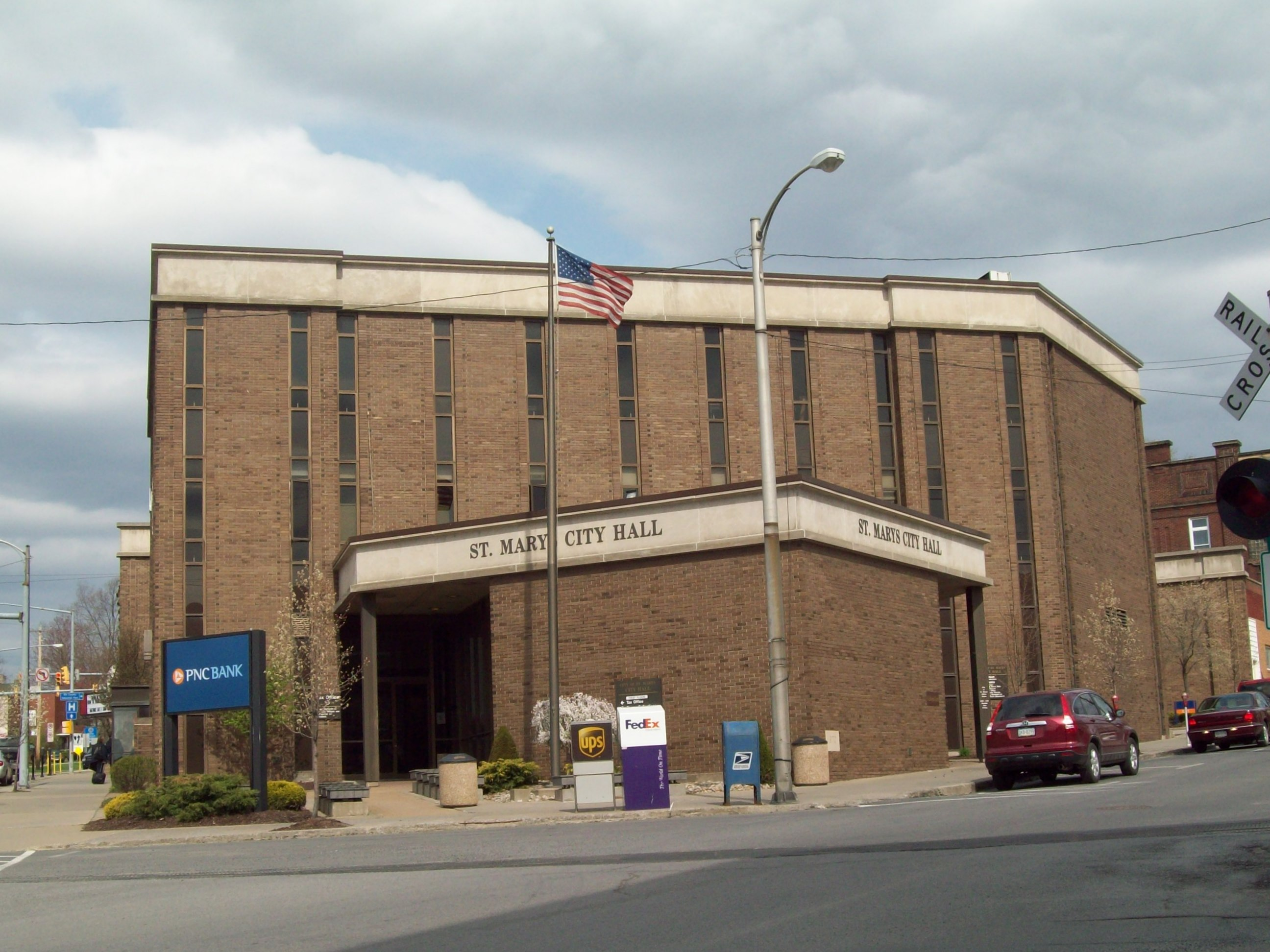
- Saint Marys City Hall

- Flag Seal
- Nickname: Powdered Metal Capital of the World
- Location in Elk County and the U.S. state of Pennsylvania.
- Coordinates: 41°25′40″N 78°33′40″W
- Country: United States
- State: Pennsylvania
- County: Elk
- Settled: 1804
- Incorporated (borough): 1848
- Incorporated (city): 1992

Government
  - Type: Council–manager government
  - Mayor: Lyle Garner

Area
  - Total: 99.51 sq mi (257.72 km^{2})
  - Land: 99.32 sq mi (257.23 km^{2})
  - Water: 0.19 sq mi (0.49 km^{2})
- Elevation: 1,666 ft (508 m)

Population (2020)
  - Total: 12,738
  - Estimate (2025): ▼12,253
  - Rank: 2,726th
  - Density: 128.0/sq mi (49.43/km^{2})
- Time zone: Eastern (EST)
  - Summer (DST): EDT
- Zip code: 15857
- Area code: 814 / 582
- FIPS code: 42-67344
- Website: City of Saint Marys

St. Marys is a city in Elk County, Pennsylvania, United States. The population was 12,738 at the 2020 census. It was founded December 8, 1842, and was originally inhabited mostly by Bavarian Roman Catholics. It was originally named Marienstadt, which roughly translates to "City of Mary" or "Mary's Town". The city was naturally renamed to "St. Marys" as English became standard, and it was incorporated as the "Borough of St. Marys" in 1848. It is home to Straub Brewery and the first Benedictine convent in the United States. In 1992, the borough of St. Marys absorbed the surrounding township of Benzinger and incorporated as a city. Despite being Pennsylvania's second-largest city by area after Philadelphia, it is one of the state's least densely populated cities.

St. Marys is in the center of Pennsylvania's Elk country. It is one of the few places east of the Mississippi River that allows hunting of wild elk. The area is known for its access to outdoor activities, including trout streams and state hunting lands inside the city limits.

== Geography ==
St. Marys is located at 41°26′15″N 78°32′34″W (41.437600, -78.542724).

According to the United States Census Bureau, the city has an area of 99.5 square miles (258 km^{2}), of which 99.3 sq mi (257 km^{2}) is land and 0.2 sq mi (0.52 km^{2}) (0.16%) is water. Most of that area is unurbanized, and the large size is due to the city's 1992 merger with surrounding Benzinger Township. The city is at a relatively high elevation of 1,666 ft (508 m) above sea level. Its territory is bordered by Jones Township to the north, Cameron County to the east, Fox and Jay Townships to the south, and Ridgway Township to the west.

The down-town area lies directly on the Eastern Continental Divide, such that water on the eastern side of the city drains into the Atlantic Ocean while the western side drains to the Gulf of Mexico.

== Demographics ==
Historical population
| Census | Pop. | Note | %± |
|---|---|---|---|
| 1860 | 692 | | — |
| 1870 | 1,084 | | 56.6% |
| 1880 | 1,501 | | 38.5% |
| 1890 | 1,745 | | 16.3% |
| 1900 | 4,295 | | 146.1% |
| 1910 | 6,346 | | 47.8% |
| 1920 | 6,967 | | 9.8% |
| 1930 | 7,423 | | 6.5% |
| 1940 | 7,653 | | 3.1% |
| 1950 | 7,846 | | 2.5% |
| 1960 | 8,065 | | 2.8% |
| 1970 | 7,470 | | −7.4% |
| 1980 | 6,417 | | −14.1% |
| 1990 | 5,511 | | −14.1% |
| 2000 | 14,502 | | 163.1% |
| 2010 | 13,070 | | −9.9% |
| 2020 | 12,738 | | −2.5% |
| 2028 (est.) | 12,869 | | 1.0% |

=== 2020 census ===
As of the 2020 census, St. Marys had a population of 12,738. The median age was 48.3 years. 18.1% of residents were under the age of 18 and 23.7% of residents were 65 years of age or older. For every 100 females there were 98.3 males, and for every 100 females age 18 and over there were 95.5 males age 18 and over.

73.8% of residents lived in urban areas, while 26.2% lived in rural areas.

There were 5,565 households in St. Marys, of which 22.6% had children under the age of 18 living in them. Of all households, 48.7% were married-couple households, 19.1% were households with a male householder and no spouse or partner present, and 25.2% were households with a female householder and no spouse or partner present. About 32.5% of all households were made up of individuals and 15.9% had someone living alone who was 65 years of age or older.

There were 6,048 housing units, of which 8.0% were vacant. The homeowner vacancy rate was 1.7% and the rental vacancy rate was 8.6%.

Racial composition as of the 2024 ACS 5-year Estimate.
| Race | Number | Percent |
|---|---|---|
| White (Non-Hispanic) | 11,752 | 93.8% |
| Two or more races Including Other (Non-Hispanic) | 331 | 2.64% |
| Black or African American (Non-Hispanic) | 165 | 1.32% |
| Some other race | 153 | 1.22% |
| Two races excluding other, & three or more races (Non-Hispanic) | 61 | 0.487% |
| Other (Hispanic) | 36 | 0.287% |
| Asian (Non-Hispanic) | 20 | 0.16% |
| American Indian and Alaska Native | 10 | 0.079% |
| Native Hawaiian and Other Pacific Islander | 1 | 0.007% |

=== 2010 census ===
As of the 2010 census of 2010, there were 13,070 people, 5,579 households, and 3,695 families residing in the city. The population density was 131.6 inhabitants per square mile (50.8/km^{2}). There were 6,124 housing units at an average density of 61.7 units per square mile (23.8 units/km^{2}). The racial makeup of the city was 98.5% White, 0.3% African American, 0.05% Native American, 0.4% Asian, 0.05% Pacific Islander, 0.1% from other races, and 0.6% from two or more races. Hispanic or Latino of any race were 0.4% of the population.

There were 5,579 households, out of which 26% had children under the age of 18 living with them, 52.8% were married couples living together, 9.1% had a female householder with no husband present, and 33.8% were non-families. 29.8% of all households were made up of individuals, and 14.2% had someone living alone who was 65 years of age or older. The average household size was 2.29 and the average family size was 2.82.

In the city, the population was spread out, with 20.1% under the age of 18, 59.5% from 18 to 64, and 20.4% who were 65 years of age or older. The median age was 45.6 years.

The median income for a household in the city was $45,802, and the median income for a family was $55,045. Males had a median income of $41,968 versus $29,489 for females. The per capita income for the city was $24,208. About 7% of families and 11.4% of the population were below the poverty line, including 20.3% of those under age 18 and 10.9% of those age 65 or over.

== Economy ==
Historically, St. Marys' economy was heavily based on agricultural, lumber, and logging. During the 20th century, multiple carbon graphite companies formed and transformed St. Marys into a manufacturing powerhouse. The Speer Carbon Company, Stackpole Battery Company, and Keystone Carbon Company (now Keystone Powdered Metal Company) were founded, and the carbon graphite industry bolstered the regional economy, contributed to advancement in multiple sectors, and paved the way for modern powdered metallurgy manufacturing processes and industry. Because of this, the area earned the nickname "Carbon Capital of the World".

This industry was crucial for World War II, developing new products for the war effort and manufacturing existing products. Many of the technologies and processes developed by this industry before and during wartime led to significant advancements in the powdered metallurgy industry.

Today this region of north-central Pennsylvania, and particularly St. Marys, is known as the "Powdered Metal Capital of the World". About 40% of the world's powdered metal parts are produced in this region at roughly 64 local and internationally owned powdered metal manufacturing facilities. Applications for powdered metal parts include automotive, small engines, power tools, consumer goods, medical devices and implants, industrial motors, defense, and aerospace.

There is still a thriving carbon graphite industry. International corporations such as Mersen, SGL Carbon, Morgan Advanced Materials, and GrafTech operate large-scale carbon and/or graphite manufacturing in the city.

Amphenol Advanced Sensors (formerly GE Advanced Sensors) operates a large-scale thermistor manufacturing facility in St. Marys that is also the headquarters of its Advanced Sensors division, employing over 300 workers.

There are also support facilities for these industries, including numerous tool and die machine shops, heat treating and plating facilities, and warehouses.

=== Employment statistics ===
As of the 2024 American Community Survey 5-Year Estimates, St. Mary's largest industry and source of employment is manufacturing. The next-largest are educational services, healthcare, and social services.

== Transportation ==
=== Highways ===
The city's main highways are PA 255 and PA 120.

=== Public Transportation ===
St. Marys is served by the Area Transportation Authority of North Central Pennsylvania, providing fixed routes, medical transportation, and Call-A-Bus service.

Fullington Trailways operates the Pittsburgh-Dubois-Buffalo and Buffalo-Dubois-Pittsburgh bus lines, which stop in downtown St. Marys.

=== Airports ===
St. Marys Municipal Airport is in the city's southeastern quadrant and provides general aviation.

== Education ==
=== Post-secondary education ===
The Community Education Center of Elk and Cameron Counties (CEC) provides degree programs, services and non-credit courses, and certification testing for Elk and Cameron Counties, including St. Marys. Over 1,200 people annually enroll in its programs.

The CEC has partnerships with Northern Pennsylvania Regional College, University of Pittsburgh at Bradford, Penn State, the North Central Workforce Development Board, PA CareerLink, and Pearson VUE.

The CEC also provides GED resources and exams for residents seeking an alternative to a high school diploma.

=== Public school district ===
The Saint Marys Area School District is a mid-sized rural and suburban public school district. The district serves the city and Fox Township, Jay Township, and Benezette Township.

The Saint Marys Area School District contains four schools and a virtual academy to serve the district's residents.

- Fox Township Elementary School (grades K-5)
- South St. Marys Elementary School (grades K-5)
- St. Marys Area Middle School (grades 6-8)
- St. Marys Area High School (grades 9-12)
- St. Marys Area Virtual Academy (online school, grades K-12)

The middle and high schools are on a campus where extracurricular and athletic activities are shared.

==== Former public schools ====
Bennetts Valley Elementary School served Jay Township until 2023. In October 2022, the school district voted to shut the school down and move the students to the Fox Township Elementary School after the 2022-2023 school year. The building is now a community center, which is also home to the PA Great Outdoors Visitors Bureau.

=== Catholic school system ===
St. Joseph convent in St. Marys, ca. 1900

The Elk County Catholic School System is an extensive private Catholic school system that serves Elk County. The school requires paid tuition, but offers financial assistance and scholarships.

The Elk County Catholic School System contains four schools, three of which are in the city.

- St. Leo School provides education from pre-K through 8th grade. It is in Ridgway and is connected to the St. Leo Catholic Church.
- St. Marys Catholic Elementary School provides education from pre-K through 5th grade. It is connected to the Queen of the World Church.
- St. Marys Catholic Middle School (grades 6-8)
- Elk County Catholic High School (formerly Elk County Christian High School, grades 9-12)

The middle and high schools share a building, where extracurricular and athletic activities are shared. The building was built in 1961.

==== Former Catholic schools ====
- Sacred Heart School
- St. Boniface Parish School (grades K-5, in Kersey)

Until the early 2000s, the Catholic school system's elementary and middle schools, respectively the Queen of the World School and the St. Marys Parochial School, served all students through eighth grade who attended their respective Catholic churches, as did the Sacred Heart School. When the school system was reworked into its current format due to declining enrollment, the Sacred Heart School closed.

In 2020, the Catholic school system shut down the St. Boniface Parish School due to low enrollment. At the time of the closure, the school had 28 students. The St. Boniface church operates the Saint Boniface Preschool in the former school.

== Landmarks ==
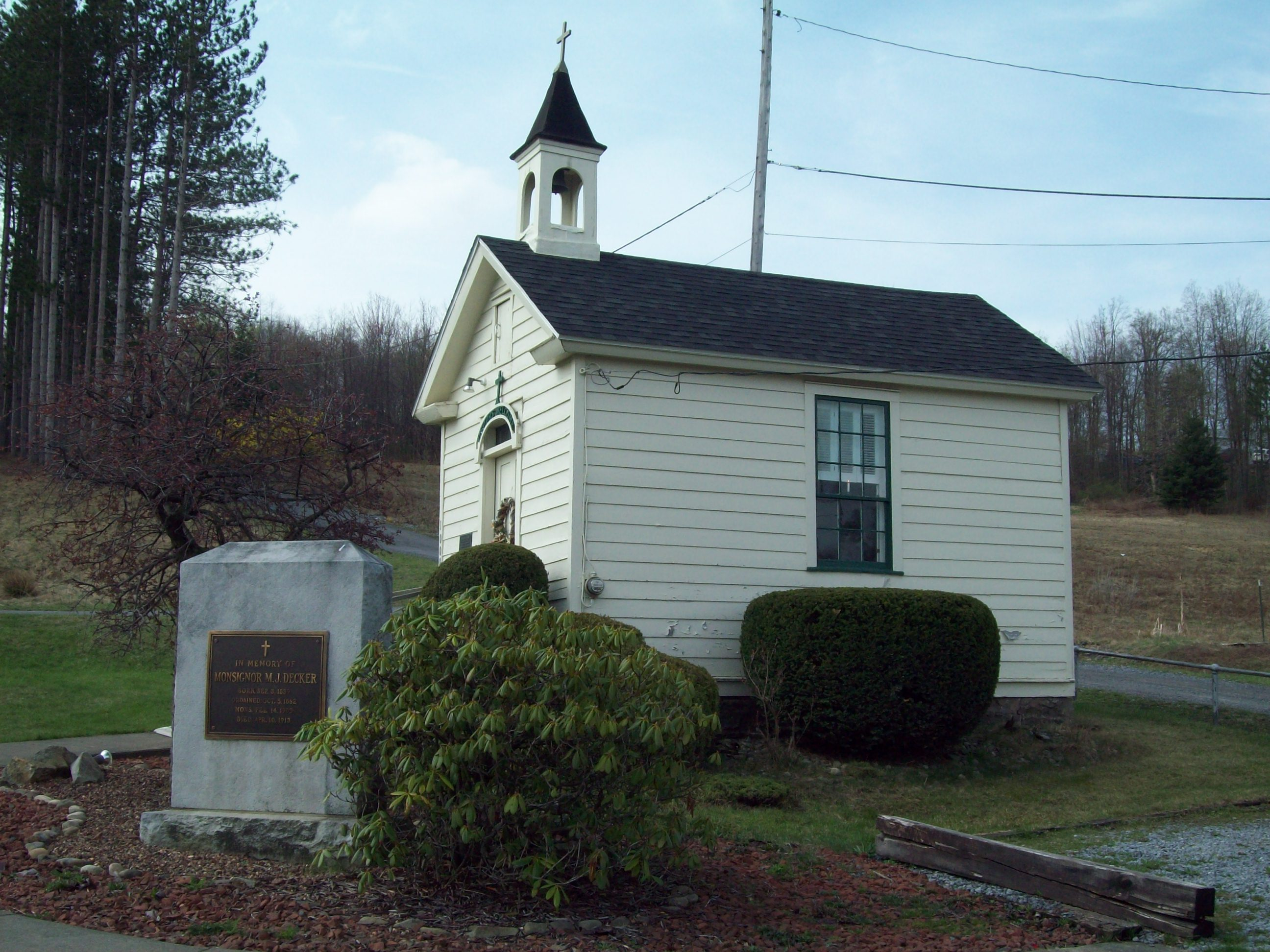
Decker's Chapel

- Decker's Chapel has been called the smallest chapel in America. It is at 1000 South St. Marys Street.
- St. Joseph Monastery, founded in 1852, was the home of the Benedictine Sisters of Elk County, the oldest Benedictine women's religious order in the United States. In 2013, the sisters voted unanimously to dissolve the community.
- Straub Brewery was founded in St. Marys in 1872 by Peter Straub of Felldorf, Württemberg, Germany, who bought the Benzinger Spring Brewery from his father-in-law, Francis Xavier Sorg. Brewing continuously since that time, Straub is the third-oldest brewery in the U.S. and considered an American Legacy Brewery™. It is still owned and operated by the founding family, now in its seventh generation. Straub is also the smallest pre-Prohibition brewery still in business in the U.S.
- The Bucksgahuda and Western Railroad is a 2 ft (610 mm) narrow-gauge railroad run by enthusiasts.

== Media ==
- The Daily Press is St. Marys' daily newspaper.
- WDDH (FM 97.5) is a country music station based in Ridgway and the most powerful station in the region, heard as far north as Cattaraugus County, New York.
- WKBI (AM 1400) operates an adult standards/oldies format. Also heard on 94.5 FM, W233BS.
- WKBI (FM 93.9) operates a contemporary hit radio format. In 2013, longtime owner Cary Simpson sold WKBI-AM/FM to Laurel Media, Inc/WDDH 97.5.

== Notable people ==
- George Albee, psychologist
- Gerard J. Campbell, president of Georgetown University
- Dan Conners, football player
- Joan Marie Engel, United States Navy Flag Officer
- Jeff Lloyd, football player
- Edward C. Meyer, Chief of Staff, United States Army 1979–83
- Anthony Joseph Schuler, Roman Catholic bishop
- Nate Sestina (born 1997), basketball player
- Joanna Shields, UK Minister for Internet Safety and Security
