= WKBI-FM =

Coordinates: 41.386°N 78.692°W

- Saint Marys, Pennsylvania; United States
- Frequency: 93.9 MHz
- Branding: B94

Programming
- Format: Top 40 (CHR)
- Affiliations: Fox News Radio

Ownership
- Owner: Dennis and Rose Heindl; (Laurel Media, Inc.)
- Sister stations: WKBI (AM), WDDH

History
- First air date: August 1966 (at 94.3)
- Former call signs: WKBI-FM (1966–1978); WTMX (1978–1982)
- Former frequencies: 94.3 MHz (1966–1996)

Technical information
- Licensing authority: FCC
- Facility ID: 65604
- Class: B1
- ERP: 2,350 watts
- HAAT: 244 meters

Links
- Public license information: Public file; LMS
- Webcast: Listen Live
- Website: b94fm.linkedupradio.com

WKBI-FM (93.9 MHz, "B94") is a Top 40 (CHR) music formatted radio station based in Saint Marys, Pennsylvania. It is owned by Dennis and Rose Heindl, through licensee Laurel Media, Inc.

== History ==
WKBI-FM has since its inception, been the sister station of WKBI (AM), which first went on the air back in 1950, and had been the first station built as part of the Allegheny Mountain Network. WKBI-FM first went on the air in August 1966, and had originally been licensed to Ridgway. Though Ridgway is the seat of government for Elk County, the station's city of license was later changed to Saint Marys, which lies about 12 miles east of Ridgway.

For a period during the late 1970s, this station was known as WTMX. The call letters were representative of the famous cowboy of the silver screen, Tom Mix. The station was located at the corner of Main St. and North Broad St. in Ridgway, PA. It was a country music radio station.

WKBI-FM was formerly on the 94.3 FM frequency until the upgrading of signal, when the station moved to 93.9 FM. Former names of the WKBI-FM include, 94.3 The Wizard, Variety 94, and B94.

WKBI-FM, now known as B94, is programmed as a Top 40/CHR Pop radio station.

Former DJs include, Erik Lane (now at WKVA), Nancy Kelley, Zack Williams (now at ENERGY 92.1 WMYB Myrtle Beach), Joe Disque, Jesse Davis, Jonny Ryan, Rich Thomas, Stephanie Rae, Jennifer Lee, Ally O'Neil, J.B. Savage (who left to work for Cumulus in Albany, GA) Shannel Huston, Taylor Jordan, Tim Allen, Terry Long, Matt Stone (known as Matt Matthews on WKBI, now at KRUZ-FM in Santa Barbara), A.J. Michaels and others.

Some of the DJs who worked there during the 1970s were, "Disco Joe Thompson", "Stubby King", Ken Hoff, Angie Fararri, Dean Paige, Rick Porter, Tom Rogers, Mark Benson, Mike McClain who was hired on January 31, 1977 at the age of 14, Keith McKervey, who left the radio station to pursue a position with the popular "Up with People", Ken Ciroli, Ray Rettger (A.K.A. Joe Emmeran)

Rick Porter is now a sportscaster and weekend DJ on 97.5 the Hound WDDH and occasionally does sports play by play on WKBI-FM.

In the 1990s and 2000s, WKBI was an owned-and-operated affiliate of the Tyrone-based Allegheny Mountain Radio Network. That network was dismantled over the course of the late 2000s; WKBI was sold to Laurel Media (owners of WDDH) in late 2012 as part of the dismantling. The sale was consummated on January 31, 2013 at a price of $766,047; the price included both WKBI-FM and sister station WKBI.
