= Strube =

Strube is a surname. Notable people with the surname include:

- Cordelia Strube, Canadian playwright and novelist
- Gardiner A. Strube, American drummer
- Gustav Strube (1867–1953), German conductor and composer
- Henrik Strube (born 1949), Danish musician
- Jan Strube, Dutch painter
- Jürgen F. Strube (born 1939), German businessman
- Sidney Strube (1891–1956), British cartoonist
