= Straub Brewery =

Brewery in St. Marys, Pennsylvania

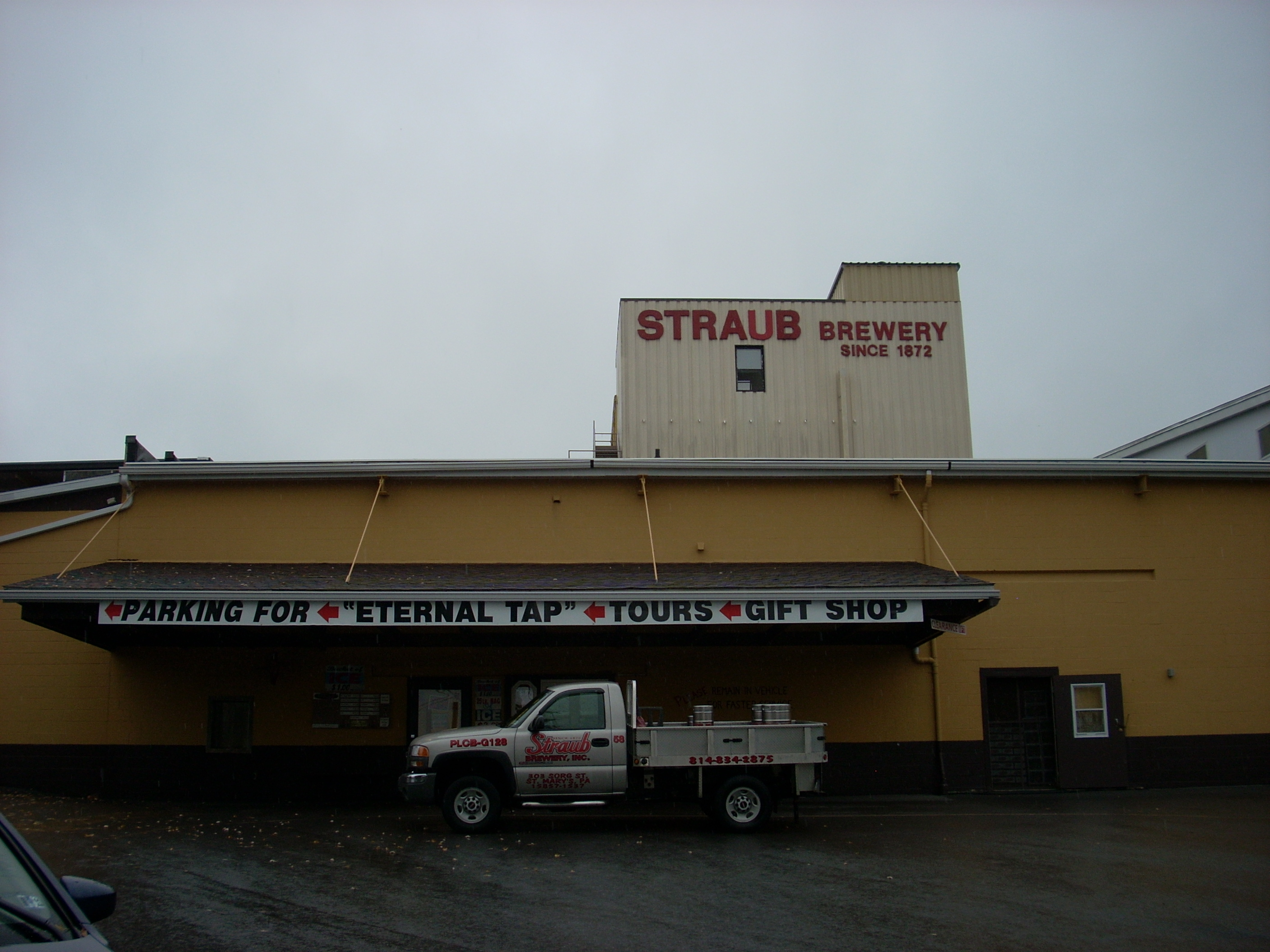
- Interactive map of Straub Brewery
- Location: St. Marys, Pennsylvania; United States
- Coordinates: 41.42761°N 78.55292°W
- Opened: 1872
- Website: www.straubbeer.com

Straub Brewery is a historic brewery in St. Marys, Pennsylvania. In 2007, Fodor's Travel named it one of the "5 Best Places in America to Drink American Beer."

== History ==
Straub Brewery was founded in 1872 by Peter Straub (1850–1913) of Felldorf, Württemberg, Germany, who purchased the Benzinger Spring Brewery from his father-in-law, Francis Xavier Sorg. Brewing continuously since that time, Straub is the third oldest family-owned brewery in the United States and is considered an American legacy brewery. It is still owned and operated by the original founding family, now in its seventh generation. Straub is also the smallest pre-Prohibition brewery still in business in the United States.

Straub is the last brewery in the United States to produce and sell beer in returnable 16-ounce glass bottles, commonly called "pounders." The brewery uses a traditional bottle-washing machine to clean the returned glass bottles and prepare them for refilling. Heavy-duty, reusable cardboard cases and dividers enable the brewery to minimize the amount of new packaging material. In 2016, the Pennsylvania Resource Council honored Straub Brewery with its "Leadership in Reusable Packaging" award for this 16-ounce Straub American Lager returnable package.

== Products ==
Straub Brewery's five year-round beers are Straub American Lager, Straub American Light Lager, Straub American Amber Lager, Straub IPL (India pale lager), and 1872 (pre-Prohibition-style lager). The brewery also produces several seasonal beer styles, including Kölsch Ale, Vienna Lager, Dunkel, Helles, Doppelbock, 1872 Lager, Maibock, Altbier, Oktoberfest, Pilsner, and Hefeweizen.

== The Eternal Tap ==
A popular tourist attraction at Straub Brewery is the Eternal Tap. Located just off the production floor, visitors are invited to sample an diverse selection of Straub's flagship and craft beers at the Eternal Tap.

The Eternal Tap has garnered national and international attention in such media outlets as the Associated Press, the Maui News in Hawaii, the Salem Evening News in Massachusetts, the Orlando Sentinel in Florida, the Saginaw News in Michigan, and the Toronto Star in Canada.

In naming Straub Brewery one of the "5 Best Places in America to Drink American Beer," Fodor's Travel specifically cited the Eternal Tap: "For the itinerant beer lover, a trip to St. Marys, Pennsylvania has the childlike appeal on par with winning the "Golden Ticket" to Willy Wonka's Chocolate Factory—only there, instead of finding the Everlasting Gobstopper, you will find the 'Eternal Tap', where drinkers 21 and older can sample what seems like an infinite amount of ice-cold, delicious Straub beer."

In the March 1, 1992, edition of the Pittsburgh Press Sunday Magazine, journalist Bob Batz Jr. wrote: "Another legend has to do with another kind of locally prized gold—beer—that is said to flow freely and forever, ala the Fountain of Youth, from something called 'the Eternal Tap.' Thirsty souls seek the tap near the center of St. Marys, and usually find it. The Eternal Tap is real."

== Awards ==
Straub Brewery has been the recipient of numerous awards, including:

- Gold (Straub Dunkel) and silver (Straub American Amber Lager) medals from the 2017 Best of Craft Beer Awards;
- Gold (Straub American Lager) and bronze (Straub American Light Lager) medals from the 2016 U.S. Open Beer Championship, during the 2016 International in Oxford, Ohio;
- A bronze medal (Straub Kölsch Ale) from the 2016 World Beer Cup, which is the most prestigious beer competition in the world that evaluates beers from all over the world and recognizes the most outstanding brewers and their beers, was awarded during the Brewers Association's 2016 Craft Brewers Conference in Philadelphia, Pennsylvania;
- A silver medal (Straub Dunkel) and three bronze medals (Straub Amber Lager, Straub Doppelbock, and Straub 1872 Lager) from the 2016 Raise a Glass Competition;
- The 2016 "Leadership in Reusable Packaging" Award from the Pennsylvania Resource Council for its 16-ounce Straub American Lager returnable package; and
- A 2015 "Brewer Partner of the Year" Award—focused on beer wholesaler relations and sales execution—from the National Beer Wholesalers Association, during the (NBWA) 78th Annual Convention and Trade Show in Las Vegas, Nevada.

== Books featuring Straub Brewery ==
Straub Brewery has been highlighted in several books written by John Schlimm, the great-great-grandson of founder Peter Straub, including Straub Brewery (a pictorial history), The Straub Beer Cookbook, The Straub Beer Party Drinks Handbook, The Ultimate Beer Lover's Cookbook, The Beer Lover's Cookbook, and The Ultimate Beer Lover's Happy Hour.

In his 2015 memoir, Five Years in Heaven, John included a passage from Peter Straub's obituary from 1913: "Judged from every viewpoint, Mr. Straub was a man par excellent among men. His business principles were founded on the highest plane of honesty and fair dealing. As friend and neighbor, he was a tower of strength in times of stress and need ... and his home was ever a home of welcome and good cheer to his many friends. Above all he was a Christian gentleman and in this respect his exemplary life will always remain an inspiration to all who came within the sphere of its influence."
