= KQV =

Radio station in Pittsburgh, Pennsylvania

Simulcasts WKGO, Murrysville, PA
- Pittsburgh, Pennsylvania; United States
- Broadcast area: Pittsburgh metropolitan area
- Frequency: 1410 kHz
- Branding: Easy 88.1 WKGO

Programming
- Format: Easy listening

Ownership
- Owner: Robert and Ashley Stevens; (Broadcast Educational Communications, Inc.)

History
- First air date: November 19, 1919
- Former frequencies: 850 kHz (to 1927); 1110 kHz (1927–1928); 1380 kHz (1928–1941)
- Call sign meaning: None, randomly assigned

Technical information
- Licensing authority: FCC
- Facility ID: 8445
- Class: D
- Power: 5,000 watts (day); 75 watts (night)
- Transmitter coordinates: 40°21′51″N 79°48′46″W

Links
- Public license information: Public file; LMS
- Website: kqv.com

KQV (1410 AM) is a non-commercial radio station in Pittsburgh, Pennsylvania, and covering the Greater Pittsburgh Region. Owned by Broadcast Educational Communications, the station simulcasts WKGO (88.1 FM) in Murrysville and airs an easy listening format. The station's studios and transmitter are located on Lincoln Highway in North Versailles Township.

KQV is recognized as one of the oldest radio stations in North America. Due to a complicated early history, the exact date of its founding has been variously stated as either November 19, 1919 (as an experimental station), in the fall of 1921, or on January 9, 1922, the last officially recognized by the Federal Communications Commission (FCC). KQV is perhaps best recognized for two distinct eras: as a Top 40 station from 1958 to 1975, the majority of that time owned by ABC, and as an all-news radio station from 1975 until the station suspended operations on December 31, 2017.

== History ==
=== Experimental broadcasts ===
The FCC has traditionally listed KQV's establishment date as January 9, 1922. However, station management has generally traced its history to experimental broadcasts beginning on November 19, 1919, although documentation for this earlier period is limited. In addition, station co-founder Florence C. Potts maintained that the station should be considered to be founded in late 1921, when the first license with the KQV call sign was issued.

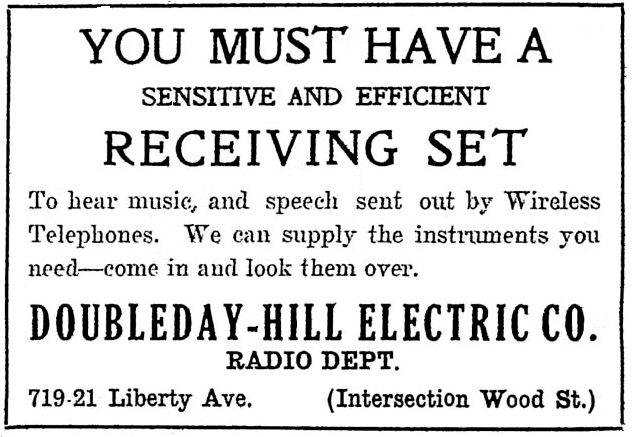
February 15, 1920 Doubleday-Hill advertisement for radio receiver sets.

KQV's original owner was the Doubleday-Hill Electric Company, located at 719-721 Liberty Avenue in Pittsburgh. Doubleday-Hill was a well established seller of electrical equipment, whose offerings included radio equipment (then also called "wireless").

=== Applying for an amateur license ===
During World War I, the U.S. government had prohibited the operation of radio transmitters by civilians, and the ban was not lifted until October 1, 1919. Shortly thereafter, Doubleday-Hill's radio department manager, Florence C. Potts, announced that the company was in the process of installing a De Forest radiotelephone transmitter, to be used for communication with a second station to be located at the company's branch store in Washington, D.C. A month later, in late November, Potts reported that the company had been unable to obtain the commercial license needed to operate the business plan. However, "a special amateur license has been applied for, to cover the wireless telephone demonstration station which the company has ordered installed and which is expected to be opened in the near future."

In late January 1920, it was announced that "The latest type of radiophone, developed and produced in the laboratory of Dr. Lee de Forest at New York City, has just been installed in the downtown store of the Doubleday-Hill Electric Company. Arrangements have been made by this company with a local music store to furnish the latest phonograph records weekly for use in connection with wireless concerts to be given on a regular schedule. This schedule has not been definitely fixed, but will be announced in a short time. The fact that different records will be played for each concert should add greatly to the enjoyment derived therefrom by the radio amateurs of this locality. The phone will also be used by this company to announced new development in radio and other items of general interest to wireless amateurs."

=== Airing phonograph records ===
A week later, it was reported that "On last Tuesday evening (January 27, 1920), the Doubleday-Hill Electric Company made a preliminary test of their new radiophone equipment, by rendering a short concert of about 15 selections, including many popular numbers, as well as operatic and classical pieces." Two weeks later saw the announcement that "The radiophone musical concerts promised the local amateurs by Doubleday-Hill Co. will start this week and be given regularly hereafter on a schedule which is, for the present, Tuesday and Thursday evening, from 7 to 10 p. m. All the latest popular music will be played and records changed for each concert. Messrs. Williams and Devinney will operate the radiophone for these concerts."

A February 29 report further stated that "On Sunday evening, February 22, and Tuesday evening, February 24, wireless concerts were given by Doubleday-Hill Electric Company, using the DeForest radiophone, which was operated by Messrs. Williams and Devinney at the station of B. P. Williams, Orleans street, North Side. Reports were received from Washington, Vandergrift and other outlying towns that the music was being heard clearly, Mr. Williams states. A few days prior to this a test was made by these radio men for the Doubleday-Hill company, transmitting the voice and music to a station in Butler, Pa., very successfully."

=== Early call sign 8ZAE ===
KQV employees have generally traced the station's history back to Doubleday-Hill's initial 1919 activities, and a September 1934 newspaper article reported that the staff was in the process of preparing a celebration of the station's fifteenth birthday. (Many later recountings give a specific debut date of November 19, 1919.) Most accounts of Doubleday-Hill's earliest activities say that the initial broadcasts were transmitted using a Special Amateur station authorization, 8ZAE, issued to Burton P. Williams, a company employee living in Pittsburgh. (Contemporary information about licensed stations suggests that 8ZAE didn't receive its first license until late 1921, although it also reports that Williams previously held a license for a standard amateur station, 8EN.)

In late 1920, the Westinghouse Electric & Manufacturing Company in East Pittsburgh launched an ambitious broadcasting service, and its efforts soon overshadowed Doubleday-Hill's earlier broadcasts. Westinghouse's first station debuted on November 2, 1920, as 8ZZ, soon becoming KDKA. In 1946, a KDKA promotional pamphlet claimed that it had conducted "the world's first regularly scheduled broadcast." KQV, and a number of other stations, such as WWJ Detroit and KCBS San Francisco, countered that they had broadcasting histories that predated KDKA. Based on their heritages, both KQV and KDKA have claimed to being the oldest broadcasting station in Pennsylvania. (A local Westinghouse engineer, Frank Conrad in nearby Wilkinsburg, Pennsylvania, preceded both efforts, conducting a series of semi-regular entertainment broadcasts at his experimental station, 8XK, from his home's garage. They began on October 17, 1919. He suspended his broadcasts shortly after KDKA debuted.)

=== Becoming KQV ===
In September 1921, it was announced that Doubleday-Hill was planning to install a high-powered station, which again was planned to be used primarily for two-way communication with a second proposed station located at its Washington, D.C. store. In addition, it was stated that the new station would "be used to give entertaining programs for amateur reception on certain evenings of each week". In October 1921 this new station was issued a Limited Commercial license, transmitting on 200 and 425 meters (1500 and 706 kHz), with the call letters KQV. KQV's call sign was randomly assigned, by later tradition it was said to stand for "King of the Quaker Valley," although from 1925 to 1931 the station's slogan was "The Smoky City Station."

KQV's initial license in the fall of 1921 was the first one issued in the name of Doubleday-Hill, and the first to receive the KQV call letters. Moreover, in the same September 1934 newspaper article in which the KQV staff dated the station's founding to the predecessor 1919 activities, F. C. Potts was quoted as stating that in his opinion KQV's founding shouldn't be considered to have occurred until two years later, when the first KQV license was issued, endorsing an earlier slogan that the station was "On the Air since 1921."

=== Unusual call sign ===
Beginning in 1912 the normal practice had been to issue call letters starting with "K" only to land stations located in the western United States. It is unclear why KQV was not assigned a call sign starting with "W," which was the standard practice for stations located in the east.

For the first half century of radio, KQV; KDKA; KFIZ in Fond du Lac, Wisconsin; and KYW, first in Chicago and now in Philadelphia, have been the only AM radio stations, still broadcasting to this day, with K call signs in eastern states. (In recent years, a handful of other K call signs have gone on the air in the east. Most are non-commercial FM stations whose construction permits were granted in the west but later were relocated to the east.)

=== KQV's early years ===
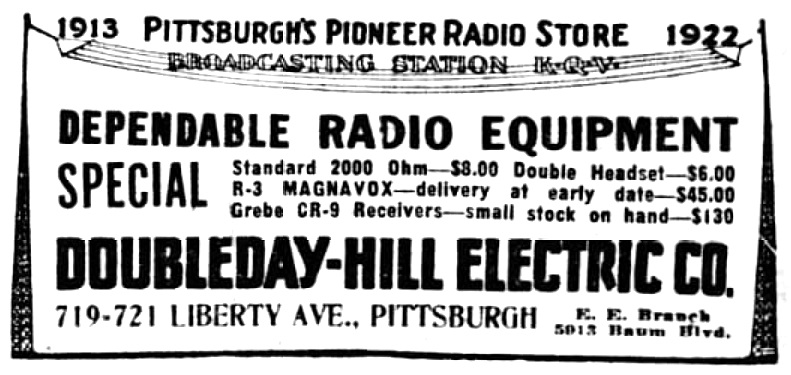
August 6, 1922 Doubleday-Hill advertisement, now promoting "Broadcasting Station KQV".

From 1912 to 1927, the Department of Commerce regulated U.S. radio, and initially there were no specific restrictions on stations wanting to engage in broadcasting entertainment to the general public. The first formal standards were adopted effective December 1, 1921, which specified that broadcasting stations had to hold a "Limited Commercial License" that also authorized operation on the "entertainment" wavelength of 360 meters (833 kHz) or the "market and weather reports" wavelength of 485 meters (619 kHz). At the time this regulation was adopted, a small number of stations already met the new requirements. This did not include KQV, which although it held a Limited Commercial License, was not authorized to transmit on either of the broadcasting wavelengths. On January 9, 1922, Doubleday-Hill was issued a new Limited Commercial License for KQV, which now included an authorization to transmit on the 360-meter entertainment wavelength. For this reason FCC records generally list January 9, 1922, as KQV's "Date First Licensed".

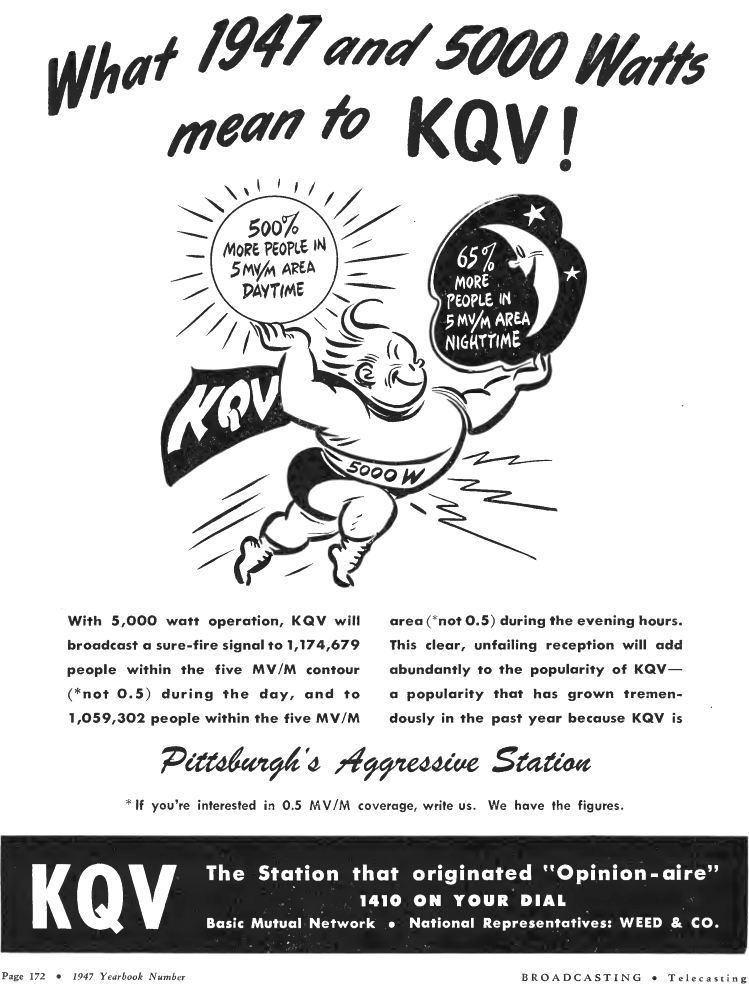

KQV's original studio and transmitter were located on the ninth floor of the Doubleday-Hill building, with a transmitting antenna that stretched across the street. G. Brown Hill, a company vice president, was initially responsible for the station's development. At its start, its primary purpose was to promote the sale of radio receivers, and KQV remained commercial-free until 1925. On November 11, 1928, a major reallocation resulting from the Federal Radio Commission's General Order 40 assigned KQV to a "regional" frequency, 1380 kHz. In 1932 the station was sold to H. J. Brennan, and the studios moved to the Chamber of Commerce building. On March 29, 1941, under the provisions of the North American Regional Broadcasting Agreement, all the stations on 1380 kHz were shifted to 1410 kHz, which has been KQV's frequency ever since.

In 1944, the station was sold to Allegheny Broadcasting. The sale was necessary because both KQV and WJAS were under common ownership, and the FCC no longer permitted multiple AM station ownership within a community. A 1947 station advertisement, promoting its power increase to 5,000 watts, described KQV as "Pittsburgh's Aggressive Station".

=== "The Groovy QV" ===
In 1957, the station was once again sold, this time to American Broadcasting-Paramount Theatres, then the corporate parent of ABC Radio. During the late 1950s, 1960s and 1970s KQV was quite successful as a Top 40 station, with Count John K. Chapel a popular radio personality during most of this period. Known over the years as "Colorful KQV," "Audio 14," "Groovy QV," and "The Big 14," KQV debuted its Top 40 format on January 13, 1958, and is remembered for its high-profile, high-energy personalities, such as Robert Wolfson a.k.a. Bob Wilson, Chuck Brinkman, Hal Murray, Dave Scott, Steve Rizen, Dex Allen, Jim Quinn, future game show announcer Rod Roddy, and their large-scale promotion of a Beatles concert at Pittsburgh's Civic Arena in 1964. During this time, KQV broadcast from its showcase studios on the ground floor of the Chamber of Commerce Building ("on the corner of Walk and Don't Walk," as the DJs would say) in downtown Pittsburgh, where the disk jockeys could be watched through a large window.

The station was dominant among young listeners throughout the 1960s, and was a major force introducing Pittsburgh to new music and artists such as Sonny & Cher, the Rolling Stones, the Supremes, the Beach Boys, the Dave Clark Five and others. KQV ratings began to slowly decline after 1970, with the advent of competition from WJAS and the rise of FM radio (including its then-sister station 102.5 WDVE, which had begun operation in 1948 as KQV-FM). One of KQV's Top 40 personalities in the 1970s, with the on-air name of "Jeff Christie," later became famous as a talk show host under his real name, Rush Limbaugh.

In 1974, another upstart competitor — AM station "13Q" WKTQ, the former (and current) WJAS — also made serious inroads competing against KQV, which briefly turned to the "14K" brand. At the end of the year, ABC Radio sold both KQV and WDVE to Cincinnati-based Taft Broadcasting. Taft made another attempt at Top 40 on KQV, this time with a far more radical presentation, with Joey Reynolds as program director, before dropping the format altogether. Its final night as a Top 40 station was October 14, 1975, with Neil Diamond's "Brother Love's Travelling Salvation Show" played as the final song.

=== "All-News, All the Time" ===
Former station logo

The next morning, October 15, 1975, KQV switched to an all-news format, carrying NBC Radio's 24-hour News and Information Service. Even though NBC cancelled this service two years later, KQV continued as an all-news station using local anchors and reporters.

In 1982, Taft executives told KQV's general manager, Robert W. Dickey Sr. (no relation to the Dickey family that founded the Cumulus Media conglomerate), that it intended to sell the station. Hoping to avoid a potential format change that often results from an ownership shift, Dickey decided to make a bid to buy the station. He received financial backing from newspaper publisher Richard Mellon Scaife and together they formed Calvary, Inc., purchasing the station from Taft that same year. KQV was the sole radio station owned by Calvary.

KQV remained an all-news station from 1975 until its sign-off at the end of 2017. After the end of the NBC News and Information Service in 1977, it affiliated with CBS Radio News and later with ABC News Radio. For a time, it used the audio from CNN Headline News late nights and weekends, and later aired some syndicated talk shows nights and weekends. Steve Lohle was a fixture as KQV's afternoon news anchor for 34 years, until his death on June 20, 2008, of an apparent heart attack. Retired weekend anchor Bob Sprague also died of an apparent heart attack, in July 2010. He had anchored weekends for more than 25 years until his retirement.

Robert W. Dickey Sr. died on December 24, 2011. His estate remained a partner in the station's ownership, with Robert W. Dickey Jr. succeeding his father as general manager. On May 14, 2013, it was announced that Richard Mellon Scaife was selling his shares in KQV to the Dickey family, giving the Dickeys full ownership. Scaife died a year later. Dickey Jr.'s sister and station co-owner, Cheryl Scott, died in November 2017 at age 65. The loss of these KQV executives took a toll on the station remaining financially viable.

=== 2017 suspension of broadcasting ===
On December 15, 2017, Robert Dickey Jr. announced that KQV would suspend broadcasting on December 31, 2017. In a Pittsburgh Post-Gazette interview Dickey cited his sister's death as the primary reason for the pending shutdown, also noting that all-news radio was becoming too expensive to support in an industry where advertising revenues were declining. He also stated that he did not want to change KQV's format because all-news was the only one he knew or wanted to air on the station. No on-air mentions of KQV's suspension were planned until its sign-off day, although in the interim he remained open to offers to buy the station.

At the time of this announcement, KQV was broadcasting the all-news format, first adopted in 1975, each weekday, consisting of news, sports, traffic, business reports and weather, from 5 a.m. to 7 p.m. The programming was similar to that of other traditional all-news stations, featuring "Traffic and Weather on the Eights," sports at :15 and :45 past each hour, and business news at :20 and :50 past. Primary weekday anchors were P.J. Maloney, Joe Fenn, Bruce Sakalik, and Dan Weinberg. In 2011, the station had re-affiliated with ABC News Radio for the first time since its days as an ABC Radio owned-and-operated station, carrying its top-of-the-hour newscasts.

During evenings, the station broadcast syndicated conservative talk radio host Lars Larson, When Radio Was (a series featuring classic radio programs such as Suspense and The Jack Benny Show) and Red Eye Radio from Westwood One. A weekly radio series, known as "Imagination Theater", was broadcast on Sundays. The station also carried public affairs programs such as Pittsburgh Profiles and Pittsburgh Global Press Conference, in addition to live sporting events, including NFL football, Penn State University football, and WPIAL football and basketball, as well as the Triple Crown and Masters updates.

KQV suspended operations on December 31, 2017. Dickey Jr. issued a personal on-air farewell following the station's usual programming, thanking the listeners for their continued support and wishing them a final farewell, before the signal went dark. At the time it went silent, KQV was operating with 5,000 watts, with different directional patterns for day and night, from a five-tower transmitter site in Ross Township. Since 1993, the main studio had been located in Pittsburgh's Centre City Tower.

=== Return ===
Because the owners did not turn in KQV's license for cancellation, the station was permitted to resume operations by Calvary or a new owner. However, station licenses are subject to automatic cancellation pursuant to the Telecommunications Act of 1996 if a station remains off-the-air continuously for one calendar year, although any resumption of broadcasting, even temporarily for a single day, resets the start of the one-year deadline period. Even though Dickey did not actively solicit buyers, press reports of the station's situation drew a number of interested potential buyers, although the Ross Township transmitter site and tower were not included because the land on which KQV's towers had been located was slated for sale as developmental real estate.

Longtime Pittsburgh broadcaster Chris Lash gave serious consideration to buying KQV before deciding instead to invest in a station near Buffalo, New York, in a similar situation, WSPQ. On January 30, 2018, Calvary sold KQV's license and equipment for $55,000 to Broadcast Communications Inc., headed by Robert and Ashley Stevens, owners of Pittsburgh-area stations WKVE, WKFB, WKHB, WKHB-FM, WEDO, and WANB. The Stevens' plan included resuming KQV's broadcasts from WEDO's transmitter site in North Versailles, Pennsylvania. The agreement also included a stipulation that one of the parties was to file for an FM translator. Calvary applied on January 31, but the application was dismissed due to missing paperwork.

On February 5, Broadcast Communications applied for permission to make the transmitter move to WEDO's existing transmitter site. Broadcast Communications' acquisition of the station was consummated on May 19, 2018. A second application was later filed to assign the station to a nonprofit subsidiary, Broadcast Educational Communications, Inc., which would modify KQV's license to non-commercial status. That transaction was consummated on September 24, 2018.

KQV briefly signed back on from May 12, 2018 to June 4, resetting the one-year counter on its license expiration, but still needed to find a permanent broadcasting site. The station held a remain-silent Special Temporary Authority (STA) while it awaited the necessary equipment for the WEDO diplex. The station again temporarily signed on in January 2019. A Special Temporary Authority request filed in October of that year listed a scheduled permanent return date of November 2019.

KQV ultimately returned to the air December 19, 2019, simulcasting easy listening station WKGO. The transmitter relocation to diplex with WEDO's tower resulted in a switch to a non-directional antenna, which required a nighttime power reduction to 75 watts, thus a downgrade from Class B to Class D.

== See also ==
- List of initial AM-band station grants in the United States
- List of three-letter broadcast call signs in the United States
