= WZUM =

WZUM may refer to:

- WZUM (AM), a radio station (1550 AM) licensed to serve Braddock, Pennsylvania, United States
- WZUM-FM, a radio station (88.1 FM) licensed to serve Bethany, West Virginia, United States
- WZUM (1590 AM), a defunct radio station (1590 AM) formerly licensed to serve Carnegie, Pennsylvania, which held the call sign WZUM until 2013
