= WKHB =

WKHB may refer to:

- WKHB (AM), a radio station (620 AM) licensed to serve Irwin, Pennsylvania, United States
- WLSW (FM), a radio station (103.9 FM) licensed to serve Scottdale, Pennsylvania, which held the call sign WKHB-FM from 2017 to 2024
