= WXVE =

Coordinates: 40°18′07″N 79°21′56″W

Simulcasts WLSW Scottdale
- Latrobe, Pennsylvania; United States
- Broadcast area: Pittsburgh, Pennsylvania
- Frequency: 1570 kHz
- Branding: 103.9 2WLS

Programming
- Format: Adult contemporary

Ownership
- Owner: Robert and Ashley Stevens; (Broadcast Communications, Inc.)
- Sister stations: WKVE, WLSW, WKHB, WKFB, WEDO, WANB

History
- First air date: December 12, 1951 (as WAKU)
- Former call signs: WAKU (1952–1960); WSHH (1960–1962); WAKU (1962–1963); WQTW (1963–2018); WKHJ (2018–2020)

Technical information
- Licensing authority: FCC
- Facility ID: 36115
- Class: D
- Power: 1,000 watts (day); 224 watts night
- Translator: 97.9 W250CP (Latrobe)

Links
- Public license information: Public file; LMS

WXVE (1570 AM) is an American radio station, licensed to the city of Latrobe, Pennsylvania. WXVE operates with a maximum power of 1,000 watts day, 224 watts night. The station is owned by Robert and Ashley Stevens' Broadcast Communications, Inc.

== History ==
=== First in Latrobe ===
WXVE first signed on the air as WAKU on December 12, 1951, making it the second AM station to come on the air in Westmoreland County, as WHJB (now WKHB) had been the first in 1934. A second station, WTRA (now WJFG) came on the air five years later after WAKU's debut.

WAKU was originally owned by Clearfield Broadcasters, Inc., which owned and published the Clearfield Progress newspaper, headquartered in Clearfield, Pennsylvania; as well as radio station WCPA. The newspaper was looking to expand its advertising reach by building or buying radio stations in nearby markets, and would do so with further acquisitions in Indiana and Centre counties. The station initially signed on the air as a daytime-only station, with a maximum power output of 250 watts, with studios at 200 Depot Street in downtown Latrobe.

WAKU, which by this time relocated to 215 Church Street, was granted permission in 1955 to increase its power to a full 1,000 watts; its current power output today.

In 1957, Clearfield Broadcasting decided to sell WAKU, as they were preparing to acquire Indiana County-based WDAD, a transaction that would be completed in 1958. WAKU was sold to WAKU, Inc., a company headed by Harry Reed on July 1, 1956. This would mark the first of several transactions over the next decade.

In 1959, WAKU was acquired by Rosenblum Stations, which also owned WISR in Butler, and WACB in Kittanning, as well as two other stations in Ohio. The call sign was then changed to WSHH, which were later acquired by a Pittsburgh FM station that still uses this same call sign today. Rosenblum Stations, however, sold WSHH to Tayloradio, in 1962. This period of ownership would also not last long, as WAKU (the station had returned to its original call sign) was sold to Westmoreland Broadcasting Corporation in February 1963, assigned the call sign WQTW, and was under the management of John Jay Stewart. In the mid '60s, WQTW featured popular radio personalities such as Tom Sidwell, John Vincze, Jim Albright and Joe Gearing and played a Top 40 and Rock & Roll format.

Westmoreland Broadcasting remained WQTW's owner until October 31, 1973, when it was purchased for $200,000 by Regency Broadcasting Corporation, a company headed by Nick and Ann Corvello, Ronald Amadeo and Charles Ludlach, with Nick Corvello serving as company president. This ownership structure would remain steady over the next 10 years.

=== 1983 Fire and Aftermath ===
WQTW experienced a major setback on the night of New Year's Eve of 1982, when the two-story building housing its studios and offices at 800 Ligonier Street burned to the ground in a fire , keeping local firefighters busy for about six hours, fighting the blaze into the early morning hours of New Year's Day, 1983. Studios and offices were first set up at the Mellon Bank building in Latrobe, the space having been utilized by competitor WTRA following a fire that destroyed their own facilities in 1975. Operations later moved to a small building at the station's transmitter site.

However, WQTW was unable to recover financially from the fire, due to the Insurance Company of America's hesitation to pay the station's claim to facilitate the purchase of replacement equipment destroyed in the blaze, with losses estimated at over $150,000. Though the cause of the fire was ultimately ruled as undetermined, the state police fire marshal and insurance investigators suspected the cause of the fire to be arson, and a subsequent investigation had revealed that Regency Broadcasting had accumulated over a million dollars in debt prior to the fire. This had prompted a lawsuit against the Corvellos in 1982 by shareholders Amadeo and Ludlach, who accused Nick Corvello of misappropriation and mismanagement of company funds. Corvello, who denied any wrongdoing, blamed a sour economy and bad luck for the station's financial woes.

These events forced Regency Broadcasting to declare Chapter 11 bankruptcy in February 1983, relinquishing control to a receiver. However, the ongoing delays from the station's insurer were inhibiting WQTW's ability to recover. Attorney Robert Slone, the federal court-appointed trustee, spoke with members of the on-air staff who started to raise questions over the station's future. When informed that the airstaff would quit if he was unable to pay them, Slone closed the station down after the scheduled 8:15pm sign-off on Thursday, August 4. After WQTW signed off, an airstaff member placed a handwritten sign in the studio window that read "R.I.P. WQTW" before exiting the station for the final time.

Stan Wall, owner of WLSW, purchased the station from bankruptcy court later that November for $66,000. The FCC approved the transfer in April of 1984. Wall announced that the station would broadcast from a 24' x 44' double-wide mobile home placed on the property of the station's transmitter site on George Street in the Derry Township village of Cooperstown.

=== 1984 Return ===
The station returned to the air in May 1984 with a full-service format of middle-of-the road and oldies music, with polka music on the weekends.

A construction permit was granted for the station in 1989 to move down the dial to 880 AM (still daytime-only and with a thousand watts of power, but with almost double the coverage), but that permit was abandoned the following year when the station was granted nighttime power of 220 watts.

In 1990, the station began simulcasting WLSW full-time over WQTW. Specialty programs of high school football, weekend oldies and polka programming remained independent of WLSW.

Since 1990, WQTW has been leased to two other operators through time-brokerage agreements, though the formats they adopted were short lived. For a brief period in the mid-1990s, the station affiliated with the Prime Sports Satellite Network, in an attempt to support the growing audience for all-sports radio.

=== 2017 Sale ===
Effective July 25, 2017, the estate of Stanley Wall sold WQTW and WLSW to Robert and Ashley Stevens' Broadcast Communications, Inc. for $605,000. The station went silent December 15 of that year for repairs. It was one of two silent AM stations the Stevenses purchased in late 2017, the other being Pittsburgh's KQV. The station returned to the air and changed its call sign to WKHJ on September 28, 2018, then to WXVE on August 19, 2020.

Some time after the sale, the double-wide mobile home, which had served as the station's studios since 1984, was removed from the property.
