= WVBC =

WVBC may refer to:

- WVBC-LP, a low-power radio station (96.9 FM) licensed to serve Bessemer, Alabama, United States
- WZUM-FM, a radio station (88.1 FM) licensed to serve Bethany, West Virginia, United States, which held the call sign WVBC until 2013
