= WJFG =

Coordinates: 40°16′12″N 79°23′13″W

Simulcast with WJFA Apollo
- Latrobe, Pennsylvania; United States
- Broadcast area: Greater Pittsburgh
- Frequency: 1480 kHz

Programming
- Format: Conservative talk radio
- Affiliations: Genesis Communications Network; Townhall News; Westwood One; Pittsburgh Steelers Radio Network

Ownership
- Owner: John Fredericks; (Disruptor Radio LLC)
- Sister stations: WJFA

History
- First air date: August 11, 1956 (as WTRA)
- Former call signs: WTRA (1956–1979); WCNS (1979–2024)

Technical information
- Licensing authority: FCC
- Facility ID: 38377
- Class: B
- Power: 500 watts day 1,000 watts night 160 watts (FM translator)
- Translator: 107.5 W298DH (Latrobe)

Links
- Public license information: Public file; LMS
- Webcast: Listen Live
- Website: pittsburghnewstalk.com

WJFG (1480 AM) is a commercial radio station licensed to Latrobe, Pennsylvania. It simulcasts with co-owned WJFA 910 AM in Apollo, Pennsylvania. They carry a conservative talk radio format and are owned by John Fredericks, through licensee Disruptor Radio LLC. The two stations formerly subscribed to the nationally syndicated JACK FM programming service.

WJFG has a daytime power of 500 watts using a non-directional signal, but at night, it switches to a directional antenna and increases power to 1,000 watts, using a four-tower array located at the end of Rocky Hill Lane in Unity Township, about two miles due east of the Arnold Palmer Regional Airport. Programming is also heard on 250-watt FM translator W298DH at 107.5 MHz.

== History ==
=== Beginnings as WTRA ===
Beginning in 1956, WTRA signed on four years after the debut of another Latrobe AM station, WKHJ, known then as WAKU. The station was owned by Latrobe Broadcasters, Inc., a company headed by Martin Barsky, and maintained studios and offices at 204 Main Street in downtown Latrobe.

=== 1975 Fire ===
The station was later sold in 1966 to WTRA Broadcasting Corporation and relocated to the ground floor of the historic Hotel Miller at the corner of Ligonier and Depot Streets, where it remained until the hotel was destroyed by a fire on May 29, 1975. Temporary operations were set up in the Mellon Bank building on Ligonier Street.

Not long after the fire, WTRA general manager Albert Calisti went back to his own radio station, WBCW in Jeannette, which went on the air in January of 1974. WCNS then relocated to 317 Depot Street, where it would remain until the turn of the 21st century.

Three years after WTRA signed on, a substitute DJ by the name of John Longo was hired as an employee; 30 years later, Longo would assume the ownership of this station. Though Longo would later leave what would later become WCNS to pursue advancement opportunities at other neighboring stations, he would later return in November 1983 as an equity partner, four years after the station was sold by WTRA Broadcasting to Advance Communications Corporation. With the ownership change came a new call sign: WCNS. The newly named station, now boasting a new country format, saw its most dramatic changes under Advance's ownership and Longo's leadership.

=== Night broadcast hours added ===
The station operated as a daytime-only radio station competing against WQTW for much of its existence, until it received permission in 1984 to broadcast with nighttime power. With this move, WCNS became one of only 15 affiliates in the United States at the time to affiliate with the Transtar Radio Network. The move was made to avoid a costly expense of hiring additional on-air personalities, putting the existing announcers to local news and sports duties, where their talents would be better utilized. The station then affiliated with Transtar's 'Country Coast to Coast' format. It was a bold move indeed, because stations utilizing satellite-delivered music formats were more music-intensive FM stations, and WCNS was one of the very few AMs that went the satellite route. A nearby AM station north of Latrobe, WCCS, (known then as WRID and licensed to Homer City in Indiana County) had achieved success less than a year before using the same concept.

With the addition of nighttime power, WCNS also built a new transmitter facility adjacent to the Westmoreland County airport, increasing the amount of its towers from one to four. WCNS also had the advantage of being the only radio station in Latrobe on the air at around this time, as the studios and offices of WQTW had been consumed in a fire the year before, which left that station silent for approximately nine months.

One by one, WCNS began to add regional sports franchises to further augment its position as a full-service station for Westmoreland County, though it was not licensed to the county seat of Greensburg. WCNS signed affiliate agreements for Pittsburgh Steelers football, University of Pittsburgh football and Pittsburgh Pirates baseball.

=== Sale to Longo Media Group ===
In January 1989, John Longo, having by this time established a solid reputation as a successful sales manager, programming and marketing consultant, and a general manager, bought out his fellow partners at Advance Communications and purchased the very station where he began his career 30 years ago under the name of his newly formed company, Longo Media Group. It was a family-owned business in every sense of the word. Longo managed the station and sold airtime, his wife Donna served as the station's business manager, and his adult children, John Paul and Lisa, also sold airtime.

Recognizing the need for an adult contemporary music format to complement the full-service elements of WCNS, Longo Media Group switched affiliation agreements to Transtar's AC II format. Later that year, Longo acquired an FM station 13 miles north in Blairsville, known then as WNQQ, giving WCNS an FM sister station (though not co-located until years later) for the first time in its history. The new station was assigned the call sign WLCY-FM.

In an unusual move that eventually paid off, WCNS agreed to affiliate with the Post-Gazette Radio Network, which started up during a 1992 strike that stopped the presses at both the Post-Gazette and its separately owned but co-managed affiliate, the Pittsburgh Press. After the strike had settled, the newspaper decided on short notice to cease the Post-Gazette Network's operations and sell its satellite-delivery network to the KBL Sports Network, the local cable TV network in Pittsburgh that carried Pittsburgh Penguin hockey. Because KBL had also acquired the radio rights to broadcast Penguin hockey, they offered the old PGN affiliates first right of refusal for carrying the broadcasts, many of which were not already carrying the games.

Because WCNS and WLCY were both PGN affiliates, Longo Media Group agreed to carry the games on both stations. WCNS had exclusive radio game rights for Westmoreland County, and WLCY had the exclusive radio game rights for Indiana County...taking the game broadcasts from respective competitors WHJB (now WKHB) and WCCS. This locked up the third and final Pittsburgh pro sports franchise for WCNS in 1993.

The next year, WCNS switched its format to oldies and took the moniker "Oldies 1480 WCNS". In 2006, following the lead of many oldies-formatted stations, WCNS chose to discard the "oldies" portion of the moniker and switched to "My Radio 1480", though the music format remained the same until early 2009, when it switched to adult standards.

Despite a very successful run of 13 years that demonstrated long-term profitability for Longo Media Group, John Longo in 2002 decided to sell WLCY to Pittsburgh-based Renda Broadcasting Corporation, which had been looking to establish a foothold in the Indiana County market. Longo Media did retain possession of WCNS.

=== Sale to Laurel Highland Total Communications ===
In a story that ran in the February 7, 2014 issue of the Tribune-Review, John Longo announced on January 30 that he was planning to retire and move to Florida. After stating that he was seeking a local buyer for WCNS, he received multiple offers from prospective buyers immediately.

On June 19, Longo Media Group entered into an agreement with Laurel Highland Total Communications, Inc. (dba LHTC Media, Inc.) of Stahlstown to sell WCNS at a price of $450,000. The FCC approved the sale on August 15, with both parties closing on Monday, September 2, 2014.

=== News/Talk ===
On February 15, 2016, WCNS switched to a news-talk format, using the slogan Westmoreland's News Talk 1480. Local news was reported hourly by Hank Baughman, Aaron Anderson and the SRN and Townhall News Networks owned by Salem Media Group.

Dow Carnahan, who won two Pennsylvania Association of Broadcasters awards in 2013 and 2014 for Best Local Newscast, was the station's main morning news and sports voice for 32 years, until his passing on Friday, April 29, 2016, at age 56.

Quinn in the Morning, with veteran Pittsburgh radio personality Jim Quinn, aired Monday through Friday from 6 to 10 am and Talk Westmoreland, hosted by Baughman, aired Monday through Friday from 10 am to noon.

From noon until 6 am Monday through Friday, WCNS aired six nationally syndicated talk shows: The Dennis Prager Show, The Savage Nation, The Mark Levin Show, The Hugh Hewitt Show, AAR's Daily Defense Hour, and Red Eye Radio.

The station covered local sports, including Greater Latrobe High School football, basketball and wrestling, St. Vincent College football and men's and women's basketball, and WCNS continued to be the local outlet for the Pittsburgh Pirates and Steelers.

"The Steelers Training Camp Live Show" was hosted by award winning sports writer and TV host Randy "Tank" Tantlinger, Katie Miller and Hank Baughman and former NFL QB Mike McMahon for three seasons.

In late November 2017, WCNS dropped its news/talk format and began stunting with Christmas music, with a switch to an adult contemporary format after the holidays.

It later began simulcasting with co-owned WXJX 910 AM, playing adult hits as 97.3 JACK FM.

On February 9, 2021, WCNS changed its format from adult hits to oldies, branded as "Westmoreland Gold".

Effective June 24, 2021, Laurel Highland Total Communications sold WCNS, WXJX, and two translators to Steve Clendenin's Maryland Media One, LLC for $475,000.

Maryland Media One agreed to sell WCNS, WXJX, and their translators to Disruptor Radio (whose principal, John Fredericks, operates conservative talk stations), for $435,000 in March 2023.

In June 2023, WCNS flipped to conservative talk with the WJFA call sign pending.

WCNS' sale to Disruptor Radio was consummated on January 31, 2024, with the station changing its call sign to WJFG on February 7. The studios and offices on Main Street in Greensburg were immediately closed and its entire staff terminated, with programming operations originating from Richmond, Virginia.

== Previous logo ==
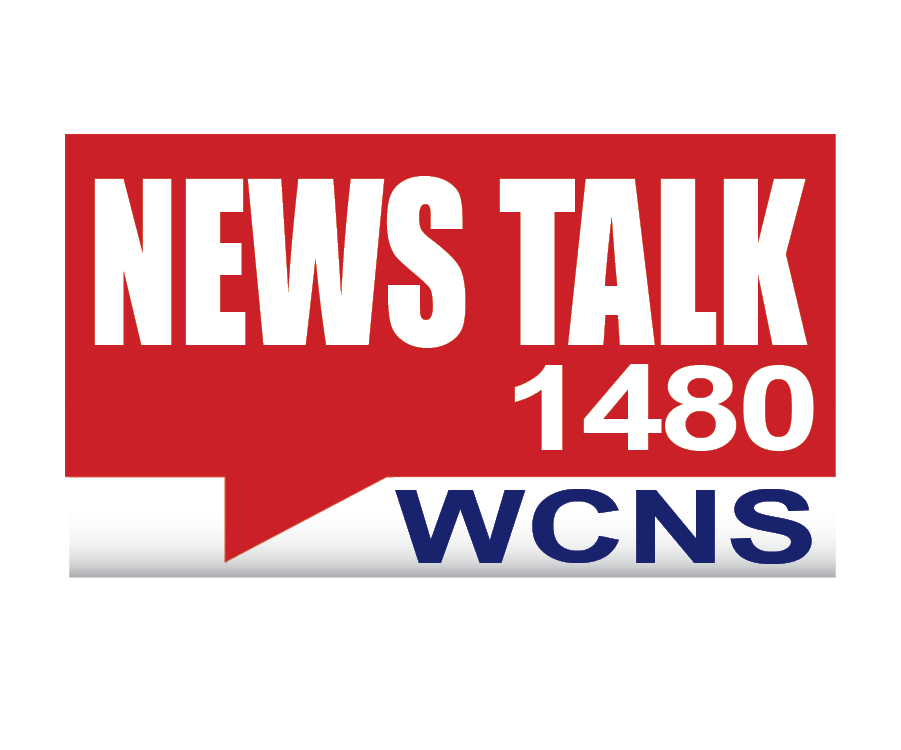
(WCNS' logo under former news/talk format)
