= KGO =

KGO may refer to:

- KGO-TV, a television station (channel 12, virtual 7) licensed to San Francisco, California, United States
- KSFO, a radio station (810 AM) licensed to San Francisco, California, United States, which used the call sign KGO from 1924 to 2024
- KOSF, a radio station (103.7 FM) licensed to San Francisco, California, United States, which used the call sign KGO-FM from 1947 to 1972 and 1982 to 1984
- The IATA airport code for Kropyvnytskyi Airport in Ukraine
- WKGO, a radio station (88.1 FM) licensed to Murrysville, Pennsylvania, United States which calls itself "Easy 88.1 KGO"
