= WKZV =

WKZV may refer to:

- WKZV (FM), a radio station (102.1 FM) licensed to serve Tybee Island, Georgia, United States
- WKZV (Pennsylvania), a defunct radio station (1110 AM) formerly licensed to serve Washington, Pennsylvania, United States
