= WJFA =

Coordinates: 40°35′01″N 79°31′34″W

Simulcast with WJFG Latrobe

Apollo, Pennsylvania; United States
- Broadcast area: Greater Pittsburgh
- Frequency: 910 kHz

Programming
- Format: Conservative talk
- Affiliations: Genesis Communications Network; Townhall News; Westwood One; Pittsburgh Steelers Radio Network

Ownership
- Owner: John Fredericks; (Disruptor Radio LLC)
- Sister stations: WJFG

History
- First air date: December 13, 1947 (as WAVL)
- Former call signs: WAVL (1947–2018); WXJX (2018–2024)

Technical information
- Licensing authority: FCC
- Facility ID: 67662
- Class: D
- Power: 5,000 watts day; 69 watts night
- Translator: 98.7 W254CR (Latrobe)

Links
- Public license information: Public file; LMS
- Webcast: Listen Live
- Website: pittsburghnewstalk.com

WJFA (910 AM) is a commercial radio station licensed to Apollo, Pennsylvania, and serving the northeast suburbs of the Greater Pittsburgh Metropolitan Area in Western Pennsylvania. The station carries a conservative talk radio format simulcast with WJFG 1480 AM in Latrobe. Both stations are owned by John Fredericks, through licensee Disruptor Radio LLC. They formerly carried the syndicated JACK-FM programming service.

WJFA is powered at 5,000 watts by day. But to avoid interfering with other stations on 910 AM, it greatly reduces power at night to 69 watts. The FM transmitter is off Devinney Road in Crabtree, Pennsylvania. The AM transmitter remains off Route 66 in Orchard Hills, Kiskiminetas Township, just north of Apollo, Pennsylvania. Programming is also heard on 150 watt FM translator 98.7 W254CR.

== History ==
=== Early years ===
The construction permit for this radio station was first applied for on February 1, 1947; it was granted on July 3. The station's original assigned frequency was 890 kHz and power output at 250 watts daytime. The FCC allowed the change in May 1947.

WAVL first signed on the air December 13, 1947. For many years, this station operated as a 1,000 watt, non-directional, daytime-only station. After being denied an STA to broadcast high school football games in 1948, ownership applied for permission to operate at 100 watts during the night in 1949, but that was denied in 1951 following a hearing on the matter. However, in 1968, WAVL was granted pre-sunrise authorization of 350 watts, which allowed it to sign on daily at 6:00 am year-round.

In 1978, then-owner Tri-Borough Broadcasting raised a second tower, adopted a directional antenna pattern, and increased its power to 5,000 watts, but still retained its daytime-only status. WAVL was granted permission to operate at a limited nighttime power of 69 watts in the late 1990s.

For much of its existence, WAVL was a conservative Christian radio station, broadcasting inspirational music and time-brokered sermons from its studios located with its transmitter site in the Kiskiminetas Township village of Orchard Hills, just on the outskirts of Apollo, its city of license. WAVL was also the first radio station in Armstrong County, with WACB (now WKFO) coming on the air the following year.

For a time at the beginning, WAVL maintained studios and offices at the corner of Fourth Street and Pennsylvania Avenue in downtown Apollo, until they were destroyed by a fire in 1956.

WAVL was founded by Andrew J. West and the Reverend Cecil F. Clifton, a deeply patriotic minister who started the station on the principle of "serving God and Country by guarding America's spiritual heritage". The station remained in Clifton's family for more than 50 years, doing business as Tri-Borough Broadcasting (referring to Apollo, Vandergrift, and Leechburg, which was also the origins of the station call letters).

The station is also speculated to have been among the first in the nation to begin the practice of brokering its airtime to ministries and other faith-based organizations, including one of the first in the nation to broadcast Messianic Jewish programming with the Rabbi Sloan talk-teaching broadcast called "Shema Israel" in the mid 1990s.

The station also broadcast local news weekday mornings in between the time-brokered programs for many years, anchored by the soft-spoken, deep-baritoned genial Carman Tubby, who was a favorite in the community for many years until his death on September 14, 2000, and became best known for addressing his listeners on the air as "friends". Tubby had worked at WAVL since its inception and retired seven months prior to his death, concluding almost 54 years of service.

After Reverend Clifton's death in 1990, the station passed to his wife Alice. Their son-in-law, Reverend Robert Dain, had served as the station's General Manager years before that. At the beginning of the 21st century, following Mrs. Clifton's death, WAVL was put up for sale.

=== Clifton dynasty ends ===
WAVL was purchased in 2001 for $400,000 by Evangel Heights Assembly of God, a church in Sarver, Pennsylvania; located at Routes 356 and 28 in southern Butler County. Wishing to move WAVL towards a younger audience, Evangel Heights decided to change the station's format to contemporary Christian, gradually phasing out the ministries, and adopting the moniker "Praise 910". The station first broadcast with a live, local airstaff during the daytime hours, then switching to satellite based programming at night, with modest success.

In 2007, Evangel Heights replaced all local air staff with satellite programming full-time, and moved the studios to the church on Beale Road in Buffalo Township.

Evangel Heights in 2009 launched a conservative all-talk satellite-delivered format under the "Liberty 910" banner, with some brokered ministry programming in limited numbers.

=== Second sale ===
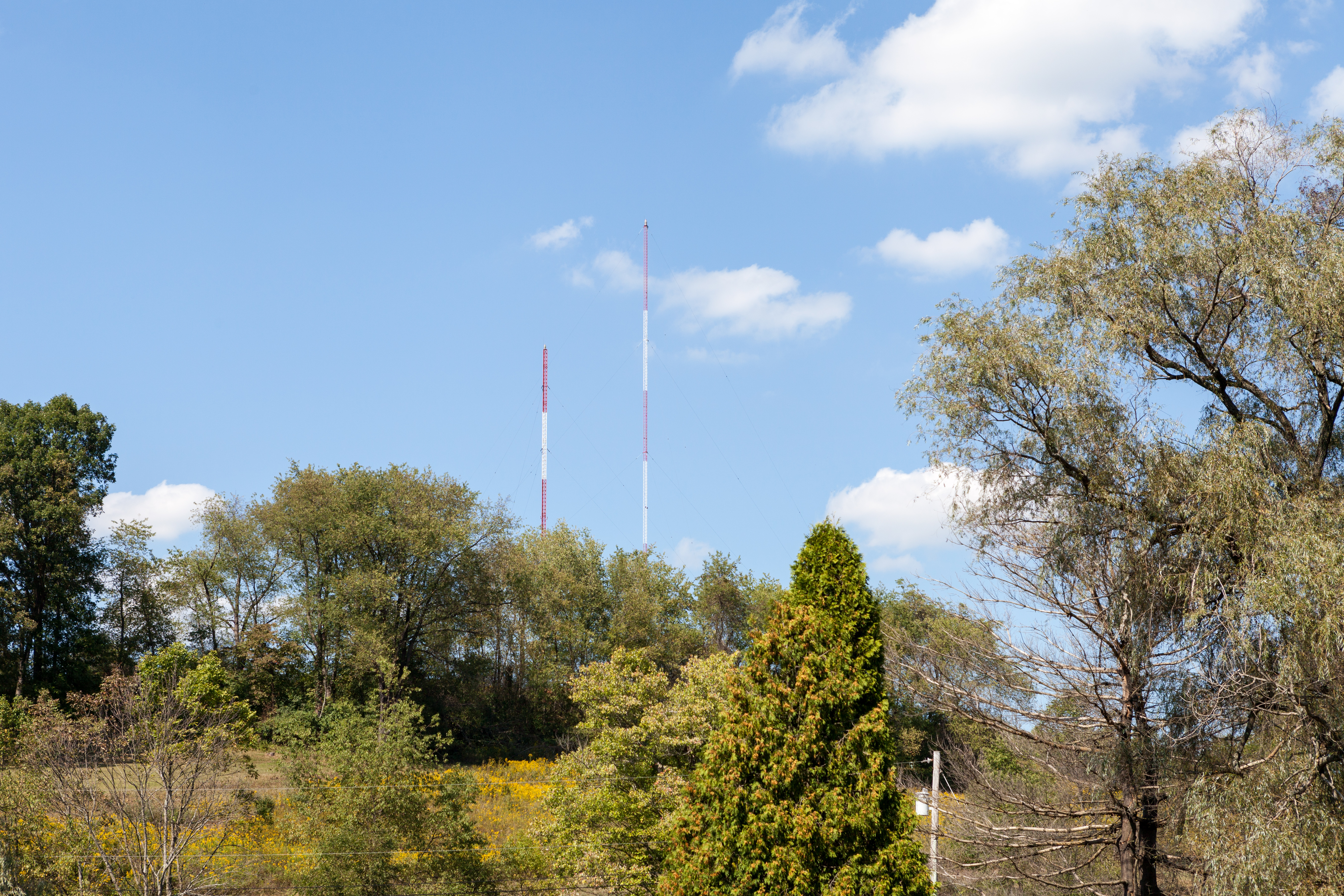
The two-antenna directional array, seen from Kings Road, looking north

In August 2013, WAVL was under agreement to be sold to Kittanning-based Family-Life Media-Com Inc., owner of WTYM and a low-power Christian-formatted television station, with the station being operated under an LMA until details of the sale could be finalized. Coincidentally, Family Life Media-Com President David Croyle once worked for WAVL under Tri-Borough Broadcasting's ownership. The station's studios were returned to its transmitter facility following the LMA, but most business was conducted from Family Life's headquarters in Kittanning.

The station was taken back to its roots of music and ministry since Family Life Media-Com's assumption of operations, with a mix of local and national shows plus featured live broadcasts from the Family Life Studios in Kittanning.

As of July 31, 2015, control reverted to Evangel Heights Assembly of God Church due to both sides being unable to work out an amicable agreement on the sale of the station. The church elected to take WAVL silent for staffing reasons and filed a Special Temporary Authority application with the FCC allowing the station to remain silent for a six-month period. On Wednesday, December 30, 2015, it was reported and subsequently confirmed that WAVL was back on the air.

The station operated under a lease agreement between Evangel Heights Assembly of God Church and the Colonial Radio Group (now known as Andrulonis Media) until the FCC approved the asset purchase agreement on Friday, April 29, 2016.

=== Third sale ===
On Monday, June 20, 2016, Allaccess.com reported that WAVL was being sold to Laurel Highland Total Communications, the licensee of WCNS in Latrobe, Pennsylvania. The $301,500 transaction included the sale of WAVL and an FM translator in Olean, New York under application to be moved to Latrobe. The sale was consummated on November 15, 2016.

=== WAVL ===
The station had broadcast "The Mountain" format, a variety music format used by other Colonial stations, from December 2015 to July 2016.

On July 1, 2016, WAVL went silent. Colonial Media, in an application dated July 5, 2016, requested Special Temporary Authority for WAVL to go dark while technical repairs and renovations were being made at the studio and transmitter site in Kiski Township prior to the transfer of the station from Colonial Media and Entertainment to new owners Laurel Highland Total Communications. On August 29, 2016, WAVL returned to the air simulcasting the programming of future sister station WCNS, until a local studio and office presence was established. The simulcast ended in late 2017, as WCNS flipped to music and WAVL kept the talk format.

=== WXJX ===
On December 20, 2018, the station changed its call sign to WXJX. On December 28, 2018, WXJX dropped the talk format and began stunting with a four-song loop towards a "Jack FM" format to launch on December 31.

Previous logo

On February 9, 2021, WXJX changed its format from adult hits to oldies, branded as "Westmoreland Gold"; the change coincided with Laurel Highland Total Communications' sale of WXJX, WCNS, and two translators to Steve Clendenin's Maryland Media One, LLC for $475,000, which was completed on June 24, 2021.

=== Fourth sale ===
Maryland Media One agreed to sell WXJX, WCNS, and their translators to Disruptor Radio (whose principal, John Fredericks, operates conservative talk stations), for $435,000 in March 2023.

In June 2023, WXJX flipped to conservative talk with WJFG call letters pending.

The sale to Disruptor Radio was consummated on January 31, 2024, with the station changing its call sign to WJFA on February 7.
