= XHMMF-FM =

Radio station in Mexicali, Baja California, Mexico

- Mexicali, Baja California; Mexico
- Frequency: 92.3 MHz
- Branding: La Bestia Grupera

Programming
- Format: Grupera

Ownership
- Owner: Grupo Audiorama Baja California; (Efemmex, S.A. de C.V.)
- Sister stations: XEAO-AM, XEZF-AM, XEHG-AM, XHSOL-FM

History
- First air date: February 11, 1980 (concession)

Technical information
- Licensing authority: CRT
- Class: B1
- ERP: 21.9 kW
- HAAT: 50.33 m (165.1 ft)

Links
- Website: www.audioramabc.com/labestiamexicali/

XHMMF-FM is a radio station on 92.3 FM in Mexicali, Baja California, Mexico. The station is owned by Grupo Audiorama Baja California and carries its La Bestia Grupera grupera format.

== History ==
XHMMF received its first concession on February 11, 1980. The station had been proposed as early as 1964. It originally broadcast as Estéreo Ritmo, airing Spanish-language pop music, before switching to grupera music as La Poderosa in the 2000s and La Bestia Grupera in 2013.
