= XEHG-AM =

Radio station in Mexicali, Baja California, Mexico

- Mexicali, Baja California; Mexico
- Frequency: 1370 kHz
- Branding: Vida

Programming
- Format: Spanish Contemporary

Ownership
- Owner: Grupo Audiorama Comunicaciones; (X-E-H-G, S.A.)
- Sister stations: XEZF-AM, XHSOL-FM, XHMMF-FM, XEAO-AM

History
- First air date: October 23, 1958

Technical information
- Licensing authority: CRT
- Class: C
- Power: 0.5 kW day

Links
- Webcast: Listen live
- Website: audiorama.mx

XEHG-AM is a radio station on 1370 AM in Mexicali, Baja California, Mexico. It is owned by Grupo Audiorama Comunicaciones and carries a Spanish-language contemporary music format known as Vida.

== History ==
XEHG received its first concession on October 23, 1958. It was owned by Luis Blando López. The first format was ranchera music as Radio Ranchito. In the 1970s, the station was known as Radio Femenina with programs for women; in the 1980s, it featured Radio Norteña broadcasting Regional Mexican music.

In 2006, it adopted a romantic music format as Romántica 1370. In 2014, it was decided to switch to English-language classic hits as Éxtasis Digital; this did not last long, and it became Súper, which had been on XHSOL-FM 88.9. In 2016, Súper returned to FM, and the Vida format moved from XHSOL to XEHG.
