= WKZV (Pennsylvania) =

Coordinates: 40°13′16″N 80°14′34″W

DWKZV
- Washington, Pennsylvania; United States
- Broadcast area: Pittsburgh metropolitan area Wheeling, West Virginia
- Frequency: 1110 kHz
- Branding: KZ Country

Programming
- Format: Defunct (formerly country)

Ownership
- Owner: My-Key Broadcasting

History
- First air date: October 1, 1970 (as WKEG)
- Last air date: May 16, 2013
- Former call signs: WKEG
- Call sign meaning: "KZ" branding

Technical information
- Facility ID: 68687
- Class: D
- Power: 1,000 watts (daytime)

WKZV was a 1,000–watt, two-tower directional, daytime-only AM radio station in the Pittsburgh radio market, licensed to Washington, Pennsylvania. On May 16, 2013, the station went dark, and returned its license to the FCC, after ending its country music format of more than two decades.

== History ==
=== The WKEG years ===
Known then as WKEG, the station was first issued a construction permit in August 1968, signing on October 1, 1970. Among the station's original staff at start-up was general manager Lew Wade, vice president Leo Shank, and chief engineer Richard Canter.

WKEG featured a full-service format of middle-of-the-road, country, and polka music. The polka show was hosted by local polka musician Gil Yurus, who joined the station at start-up and remained until financial troubles began in the late 1980s.

WKEG maintained its original owner until September 1972, when DiLeLo Broadcasting sold the station to Nascone Enterprises (dba Genas Broadcasting), a company headed by Joseph P. Nascone, the former sales manager of WTAE Radio in Pittsburgh.

Upon acquisition, Joe Nascone changed the station's format to easy listening. Genas Broadcasting operated the station until 1987 when it was purchased by Ferguson Broadcasting.

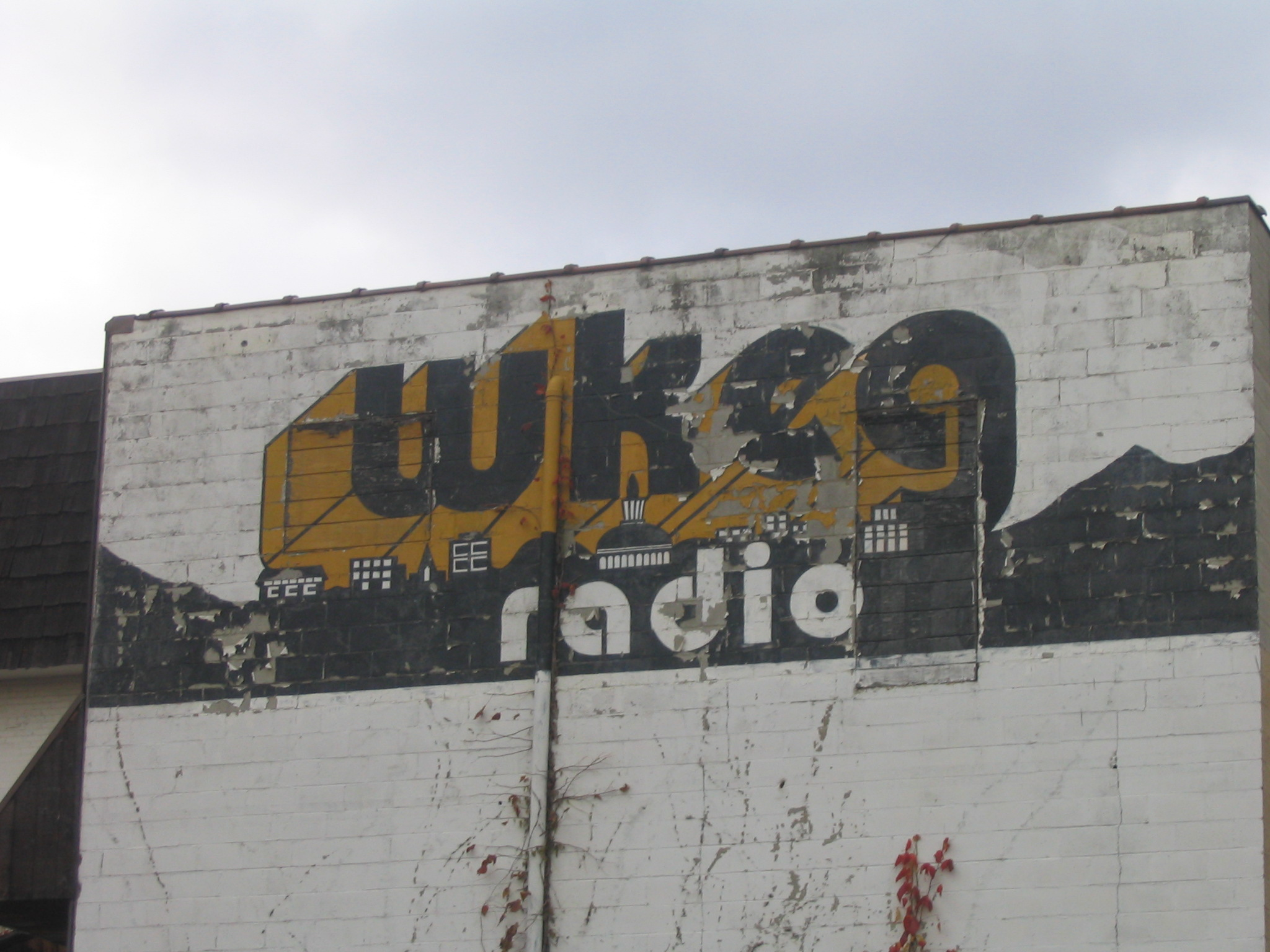
WKEG bill painted on building on North College Avenue at East Chestnut Street, Washington, Pennsylvania; across and down the street from the current WKZV studios, 2007

For many of its early years, the station operated out of a trailer at its transmitter site at 59 McLane Road (now Whitetail Drive) in Chartiers Township, north of downtown Washington, and then to the former George Washington Hotel in downtown Washington.

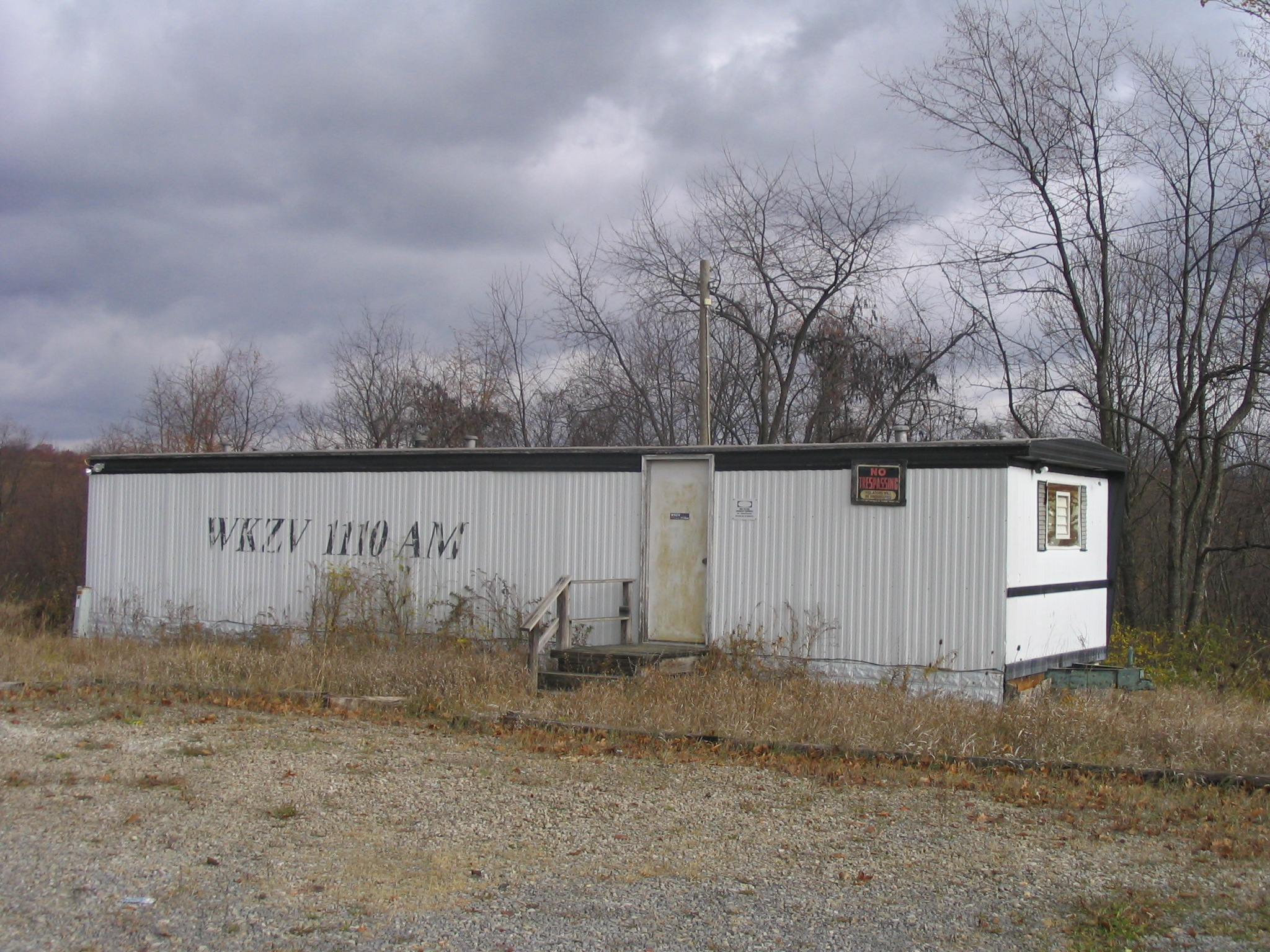
WKZV's transmitter building and original studio on Whitetail Drive, pre-1980s

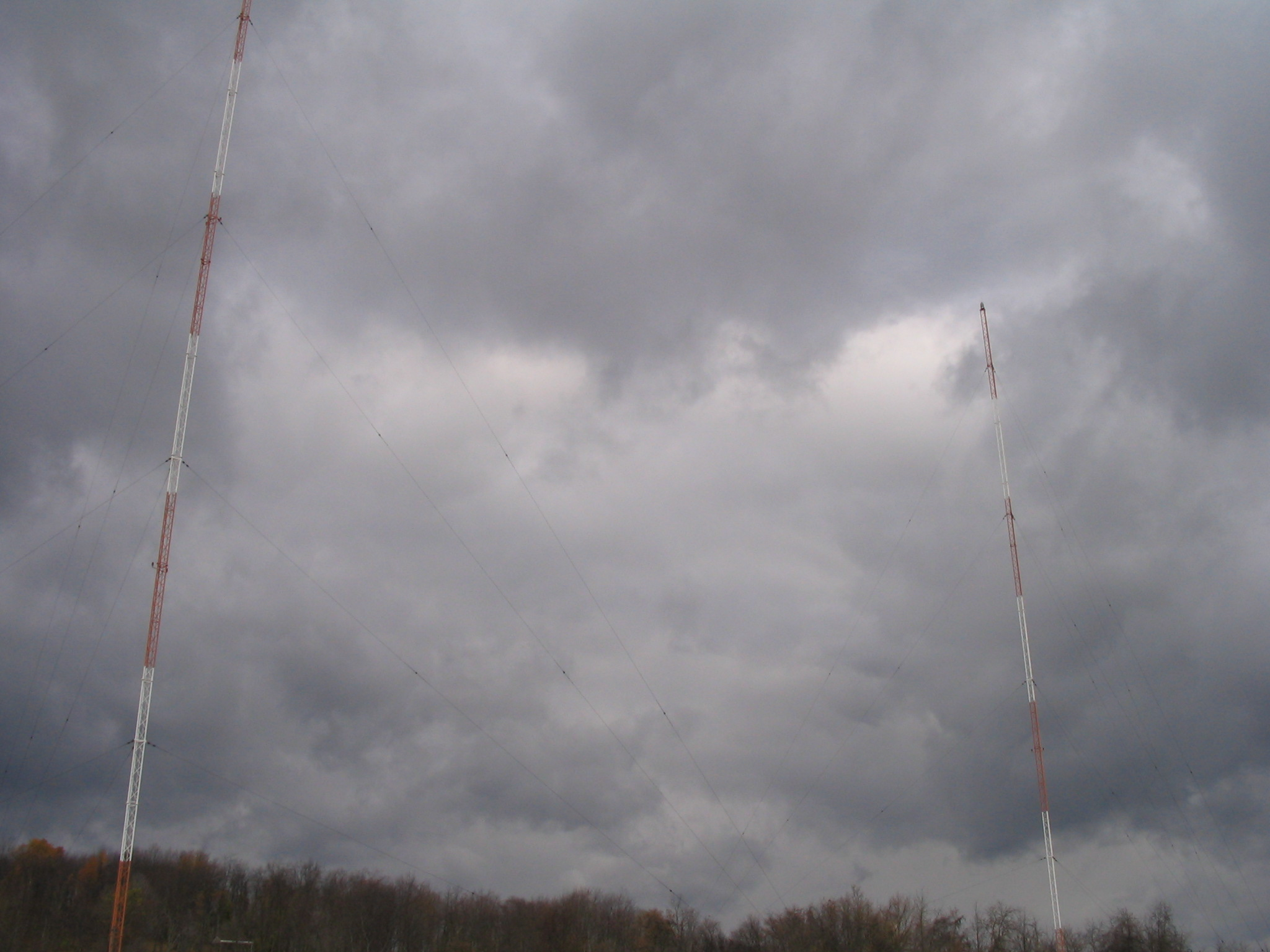
WKZV two-tower directional antenna array

The station would move in the late 1980s to another studio location at 71 North Main Street in downtown Washington, following its purchase by Ferguson Broadcasting, and then to its final location on East Chestnut Street in 1990.

The third owner, William Ferguson, changed the station's format to adult contemporary, delivered via satellite through the Transtar Radio Network. The station ended up going dark in two years.

The station was then purchased by JJG Communications, a company headed by Carmichaels businessman John G. Brodak and John Loeper, the former general manager of WANB/WANB-FM in Waynesburg, Pennsylvania.

JJG made another go of the station, this time with a news/talk/sports format, also mostly via satellite. The station failed again, and was off the air by October 1991.

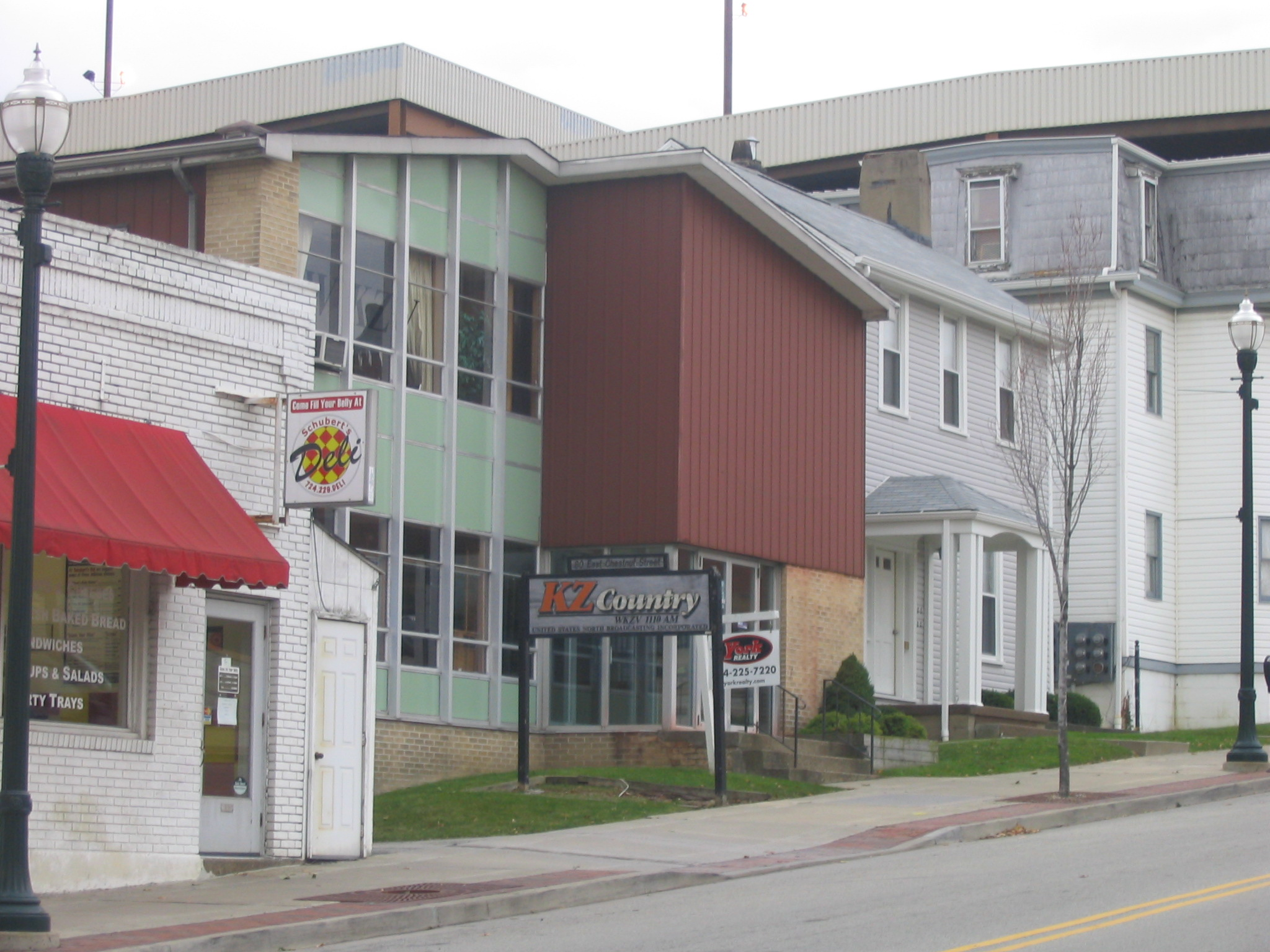
WKZV's final studio location, second floor, 80 East Chestnut Street, Washington, Pennsylvania; note WKZV call letters on second-floor studio window and front sign

=== Rebirth as WKZV ===
The station returned to the air in the spring of 1992, this time with a new set of call letters; WKZV ("KZ Country") and a new owner, U.S. North Broadcasting, Inc.

Despite their best efforts and investment in studio overhauls, the station did not prosper. A little over a year later Helen Supinski bought the station from U.S. North Broadcasting, Inc. in March 1993, and continued to do business until May 2013 as My-Key Broadcasting. Polka disc-jockey Mike Panjuscek served as station manager.

The new owner discontinued satellite-delivered country music format in May 1995 and hired two local announcers, Jeff Martin and Randy Allum, each working half of the broadcast day. Martin was the station's program director and Allum was music director. Jeffrey Gorman was the news director and Melissa Anderson worked weekends.

Panjuscek gradually shifted the format to more of a classic country sound, with special emphasis on local country music artists and those on independent record labels, especially on weekends when Panjuscek did a Saturday afternoon show made up of bluegrass, classic country, and local artists. On Sunday afternoons Panjuscek, as "Polka Mike," did a show exclusively featuring polka music.

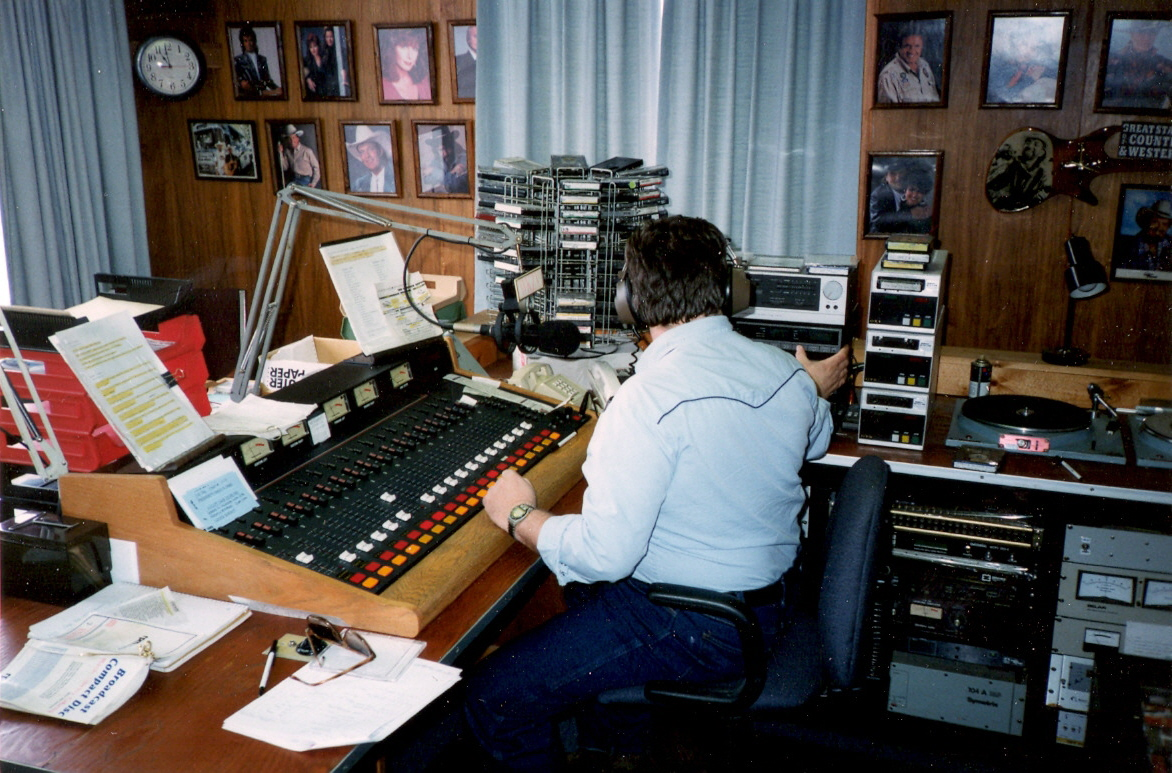
Announcer Randy Allum at the controls, WKZV's main on-air studio, 1996

=== Cease of operations ===
Panjuscek died on September 17, 2011.

The station owner, Helen Supinski, closed the station at the end of the day on Tuesday, May 14, 2013.

In a letter to the FCC dated that day, WKZV's communications attorneys cited health reasons and adverse economic conditions as reasons to surrender the license. The FCC cancelled the station's license on May 21, 2013.

Helen Supinski died April 26, 2014, at the age of 90. Not long afterwards, the WKZV transmission towers were dismantled and the building on Chestnut Street was razed after the property had been sold to Washington and Jefferson College.
