= WEDO =

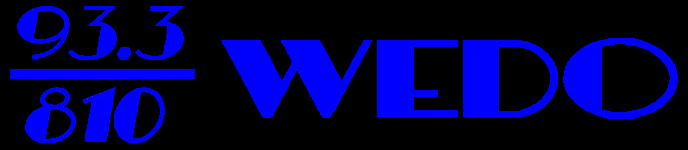
- McKeesport, Pennsylvania; United States
- Broadcast area: Pittsburgh metropolitan area
- Frequency: 810 kHz
- Branding: "WEDO AM 810"

Programming
- Format: Brokered programming (ethnic, religious, special interest)

Ownership
- Owner: Robert and Ashley Stevens; (Broadcast Communications, Inc.)
- Sister stations: WKFB, WKHB, WKVE, WLSW, WXVE

History
- First air date: 1947
- Call sign meaning: We Do Radio

Technical information
- Licensing authority: FCC
- Class: D
- Power: 1,000 watts (daytime only)
- Transmitter coordinates: 40°21′51″N 79°48′46″W
- Translators: 93.3 W227DB (McKeesport); 105.1 W286CZ (Greensburg)

Links
- Public license information: Public file; LMS
- Webcast: Listen live
- Website: www.wedo810.com

WEDO (810 kHz) is a commercial AM radio station licensed to McKeesport, Pennsylvania and serving Greater Pittsburgh. It carries a brokered programming radio format. Hosts buy segments of time on the station and may use their shows to advertise their products and services or seek donations to their ministries. Some shows are for ethnic communities, some are religious and others are devoted to special interests. WEDO is owned by Robert and Ashley Stevens through licensee Broadcast Communications, Inc. The studios and offices are located at the intersection of US Route 30 and PA Route 48 in North Versailles, Pennsylvania, sharing space with other BCI-owned stations.

== Technical information ==
By day, WEDO transmits with 1,000 watts. The transmitter is off Foster Road, also in White Oak. As AM 810 is a clear channel frequency reserved for Class A stations WGY in Schenectady and KSFO in San Francisco; to avoid interference, WEDO must sign off at night when radio waves travel farther. Programming is heard around the clock on 50-watt FM translator W227DB at 93.3 MHz.

== History ==
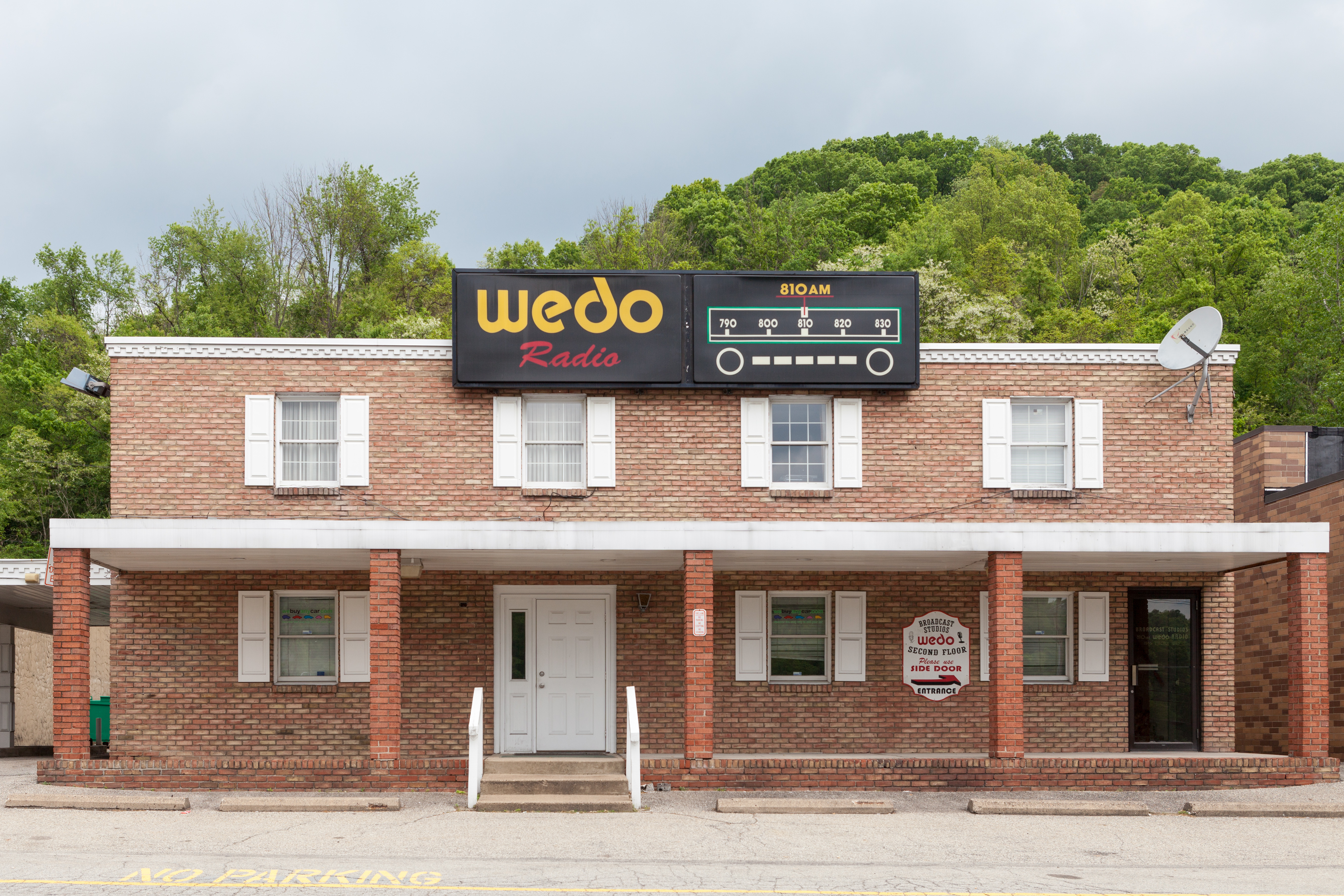
Studio and offices in White Oak, Pennsylvania from 2000 to 2015.

The station signed on in 1947, at around the same time as another McKeesport-licensed radio station, WMCK (1360 AM, now WGBN). WEDO has had only this call sign, and only three owners in its history. Tri-City Broadcasting first put the station on the air and operated it until 1972, when it was purchased by 810, Inc., a wholly owned company headed by local entrepreneurs Ralph and Judith Baron.

During the 1960s and 1970s, WEDO became known for its Top 40 music presentation and even received more notoriety when they relocated their studios and offices inside Midtown Plaza Mall on Fifth Avenue in downtown McKeesport during the 1970s. The mall, one of the first in suburban Pittsburgh, enabled shoppers to watch the DJs in real time as they did their on-air shifts.

In the early 1980s, when FM emerged as the leading technology for music, WEDO gradually dropped its music for the program-oriented format that it originally had in its formative years. As McKeesport's downtown economy continued to deteriorate, so did tenant business in Midtown Plaza Mall, as many of the stores went out of business or relocated into the suburbs. With few tenants left in the building, the property's managers turned off heat to several areas of the mall in an effort to reduce operating costs. A heating problem one day in 2000 resulted in a frozen pipe bursting in the mall and leaving the radio station in about two inches of standing water. According to a former employee, it was the second time that such an incident occurred.

Management then decided to relocate to a different building. WEDO cleared its equipment and furniture out of the mall weeks later and moved to a former bank location in White Oak at 1985 Lincoln Way, where it occupied the second floor.

In the spring of 1999, WEDO was the victim of a not-so-innocent and dangerous prank committed by local high school students at its transmitter facility in Forest Hills, as explained in the April 13, and 29, 1999 issue archives of the Tribune-Review...

Police blame vandals for toppled radio tower...officials say cables cut; WEDO-AM is off air

Vandals cut the wires supporting a McKeesport radio station's transmitting tower, police said, allowing high winds to blow down the tower and knock the station off the air early Monday morning.

WEDO-AM may be dark for a week or more, said John James, vice president and general manager.

The damage to the 300-foot-tall tower along Foster Road in North Versailles Township was discovered early yesterday. Only a 30-foot section remains standing, James said.

The station, whose studios are in Midtown Plaza Mall in McKeesport, has an old daytime-only broadcasting license. WEDO had signed off on Sunday before 8 p.m.

North Versailles acting police Chief James Comunale said two of six wires supporting the tower were clearly cut. Though the tower was protected by a fence, the wires stretched deep into the woods, he said.

"I personally believe (the wires were) cut prior to this and the wind took it down last night," Comunale said. "We found no footprints and with all the rain we've had, we would have seen footprints."

Local youths frequent the trails in the woods nearby, he said.

James, of North Huntingdon Township, said he was looking for a replacement tower. If one can't be found quickly, he said, he'll look for a temporary broadcasting site, possibly on another station's tower.

Radio station is back after rebuilding tower

WEDO-AM, the McKeesport radio station knocked out of commission when its tower was felled about two weeks ago, is back on the air.

Station vice president and general manager John James said Wednesday a new tower has been constructed at the same North Versailles Township site as its previous one. WEDO, a 1,000-watt station, signed back onto the airwaves at 6 a.m. Tuesday.

James said he estimates the cost of the new tower at more than $60,000, which is expected to be covered by insurance.

"We're in the process of working with the insurance company right now," he reported.

The amount of lost advertising revenue has not been determined, but he expects the station's insurance to cover that as well.

"We lost a bundle," James said.

A 16-year-old White Oak resident has been charged with criminal mischief in the incident. North Versailles police said strong winds toppled the tower after guy wires holding it in place were cut on April 11.

=== Change in Ownership ===
On Tuesday, September 15, 2015, it was announced that 810 Inc. agreed to sell WEDO to Broadcast Communications, Inc. of Irwin, Pennsylvania, licensee of WKFB, WKHB, WANB, WKVE and three FM translators in the Pittsburgh market, plus other broadcast properties in the Cumberland, Maryland market. The sale was finalized on January 5, 2016, at a purchase price of $175,000.

=== WEDO people ===
John James managed the station from June 1982 until retiring in 2014. James' predecessor, David Leiner took over for longtime manager John Longo in 1980. Longo went on to own and operate WCNS, about 50 miles (80 km) east of Pittsburgh until his retirement in 2014.
