= XHMC-FM =

Radio station in Mexicali, Baja California, Mexico

- Mexicali, Baja California; Mexico
- Frequency: 104.9 MHz
- Branding: La Invasora

Programming
- Format: Regional Mexican

Ownership
- Owner: Uniradio; (Radiodifusora XHMC, S.A. de C.V.)

History
- First air date: 1984

Technical information
- Licensing authority: CRT
- Class: B
- ERP: 12.58 kW
- HAAT: 39.4 m (129 ft)
- Transmitter coordinates: 32°38′18.96″N 115°28′18.84″W

Links
- Webcast: https://streamingcwsradio30.com/8076/stream
- Website: https://www.invasora1049.com/

XHMC-FM is a radio station on 104.9 FM in Mexicali, Baja California, Mexico. The station is owned by Uniradio and airs a Regional Mexican music format known as La Invasora.

== History ==
XHMC received its concession on November 10, 1987. It was owned by Rosa Ruíz de Reyes and has been operated by Radiorama for most of its history. It was first known as Estéreo Vida, broadcasting contemporary music in Spanish. At the end of 2013 it was renamed "Vida 104.9". In 2014, Vida moved to XHSOL-FM 89.9, and 104.9 converted to contemporary hit radio as Juventud 104.9, adopting the Arroba FM brand in 2015.

Previous logo

In 2017, control of the Radiorama Mexicali cluster was transferred to Grupo Larsa Comunicaciones, marking its first expansion outside of the state of Sonora. On December 1, XHMC was relaunched as "Arroba Sin Límites", retaining the name of its previous pop format (Arroba FM/@FM) while adding that used on Larsa's other similarly formatted stations. In September 2018, Larsa stopped operating the Mexicali stations, with Radiorama and the full Arroba FM brand returning.

Uniradio assumed operational control of XHMC-FM in January 2024 and relaunched it as La Invasora.
