= WZUM (AM) =

Radio station in Pennsylvania, US

Coordinates: 40°24′47.3″N 79°51′13.2″W

Simulcast of WZUM-FM, Bethany, West Virginia
- Braddock, Pennsylvania; United States
- Broadcast area: Pittsburgh, Pennsylvania
- Frequency: 1550 kHz
- Branding: The Pittsburgh Jazz Channel

Programming
- Format: NPR, jazz

Ownership
- Owner: Pittsburgh Public Media
- Sister stations: WZUM-FM

History
- First air date: 1947 (as WLOA)
- Former call signs: WLOA (1947–1979); WHYW (1982–1983); WJLY (1983–1988); WCXJ (1988–2000); WURP (2000–2007); WLFP (2007–2013)
- Call sign meaning: "Zoom"; a tribute to the former WZUM (1590 AM)

Technical information
- Licensing authority: FCC
- Facility ID: 68903
- Class: D
- Power: 1,000 watts day 4 watts night
- Translator: 101.1 W266CV (Braddock)

Links
- Public license information: Public file; LMS
- Webcast: Listen Live
- Website: wzum.org

WZUM (1550 kHz) is a jazz AM radio station serving the Pittsburgh, Pennsylvania market. The station broadcasts with a power of 1,000 watts daytime (4 watts at night) from studios in South Park, Pennsylvania, and is licensed to Braddock, Pennsylvania.

== Programming ==
Before changing to jazz as WZUM, 1550's programming was provided by a format developed by veteran Pittsburgh radio programmer Clarke Ingram.

Before changing to urban oldies in 2013, WZUM's most of 1550's programming was provided by the Lifestyle TalkRadio Network.

WZUM was the "Flagship Station" of the Woodland Hills Wolverine Football Network. A.W. Gusky Productions produced the broadcasts of Woodland Hills High School football.

== History ==
=== As WLOA ===
This station began as WLOA, with the construction permit first applied for on August 13, 1946. The initial permit was for the station to operate at 910 kHz at a power output of 1,000 watts, daytime only, from a transmitter site to be determined in Swissvale. The permit was amended later than November to move from 910 kHz to its current channel of 1550 kHz, daytime only. In December 1946, the transmitter site located on a hill northeast of Braddock was selected and approved by the FCC. In January 1947, the station applied for permission to increase its daytime power from 1,000 watts daytime non-directional to 5,000 watts and add nighttime power using a directional antenna system. That application was dismissed in February 1947.

On May 20, 1947, WLOA signed on the air from its studios at 1233 Braddock Avenue in Braddock, doing business as Matta Broadcasting Company. On June 1, 1959, the station signed on its same-named FM sister, known today as WRRK. The FM provided local radio service after the AM was required to sign off after local sunset.

Before becoming famous, actor George Peppard was a DJ at WLOA and frequently talked about working at the station, including once while delivering the weather, accidentally forecasting "flow snurries" instead of snow flurries.

=== As WFFM ===
In 1972, station co-founder William G. Matta, died. Later that year, the station was transferred from his estate to William J. Matta and Mrs. E.R. Matta, with William J. Matta taking full control of the station in 1975. In 1979, the station took the call letters of its sister FM station, by this time known as WFFM, which had adopted them in 1977 and separated itself from its AM sister. The FM station was renamed WFFM-FM and the AM became a full simulcast as WFFM.

=== Station sale; WCKG ===
The station was re-assigned the call letters WCKG on May 6, 1981. On May 12, 1982, WCKG and WFFM were sold by Matta Broadcasting Company to Benns Communications. Two years later, Benns sold WCKG to Unity Broadcasting Corporation, thus ending over two decades of common ownership between the AM and FM stations. Unity Broadcasting changed the call letters to WJLY and adopted a religion-based format.

=== As WCXJ ===
Unity Broadcasting sold the station, by this time known as WCXJ, in November 1991 to the Homewood-Brushton Revitalization & Development Corporation, which moved the station to 7138 Kelly Street in Pittsburgh. Legendary Pittsburgh urban radio programmer Del King was named the station's general manager. King initiated a diverse format of Urban adult contemporary, talk and religion under this stage of ownership.

WCXJ was sold in 1996 to East Coast Communications, Incorporated, which left the format mostly intact. By this time, Del King had left as manager of the station to pursue ownership opportunities, but was retained as chief engineer for WCXJ.

=== As WURP ===
WCXJ was sold in May 2000 to Urban Radio of Pennsylvania, a subsidiary of Inner City Broadcasting, which acquired both this station and sister WHAT in Philadelphia in a $1.5 million transaction. As WURP, the station, at first, featured an Urban AC format (which began in August 2000), and then, in December 2002, it flipped to "hot talk" with hosts such as The Young Turks, G. Gordon Liddy, Don and Mike, Sporting News Radio, and weekend programming from Air America Radio. WURP also aired the locally produced "UnShow with Jeff Schneider".

=== As WLFP ===
Inner City Broadcasting sold the station to BusinessTalkRadio.net in March 2007, and as WLFP, it aired shows from the Lifestyle TalkRadio Network until its sale in May 2013.

AM Guys LLC purchased the station for $14,515 from a SEC receiver appointed to operate it and other assets of the Business Talk Radio Network. AM Guys, headed by Edward DeHart and Stephen Zalenko, had leased the studio and its equipment to Business Talk Radio, and performed sales duties for the company on a contract basis. The purchase was consummated on June 18, 2013.

=== As WZUM ===
On June 26, 2013, the station changed its call sign to WZUM (formerly at 1590 AM in Carnegie, Pennsylvania). On July 4, 2013, the station relaunched with an urban oldies format developed by veteran Pittsburgh radio programmer Clarke Ingram.

Effective March 30, 2016, AM Guys LLC sold WZUM to Pittsburgh Public Media for $75,000. On April 2, 2016, WZUM changed formats to a simulcast of jazz-formatted WYZR 88.1 FM Bethany, West Virginia. Since 2017, WZUM AM has been rebroadcast in Pittsburgh on FM translator W266CV at 101.1 FM.
