= XEZF-AM =

Radio station in Mexicali, Baja California, Mexico

- Mexicali, Baja California; Mexico
- Frequency: 850 kHz
- Branding: Buenisiima

Programming
- Format: Grupera

Ownership
- Owner: Grupo Audiorama Baja California; (XEZF-AM, S.A.)
- Sister stations: XEAO-AM, XEHG-AM, XHMMF-FM, XHSOL-FM

History
- First air date: November 27, 1963

Technical information
- Licensing authority: CRT
- Class: C
- Power: 250 watts day

Links
- Website: www.audioramabc.com/buenisimamexicali/

XEZF-AM is a radio station on 850 AM in Mexicali, Baja California, Mexico. It is owned by Grupo Audiorama and is known as Buenisiima with a grupera format.

== History ==
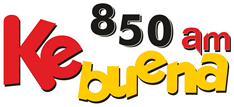
Logo with Ke Buena until 2017

XEZF received its first concession on November 27, 1963. It was owned by Miguel Vildosola Castro and sold by his successors to Silvia Lacarra Hinojosa in 1996. Hinojosa sold to Radiorama in 1998. In 2001, the station began broadcasting grupera music under the name Sonido Banda, switching to English-language classic hits as Éxtasis 850 in 2003. A year later, the format was changed to Caribbean music as La ZF, with a second name change to La Más Picuda in 2006.

In 2008, XEZF changed formats again to La Instrumental de Mexicali, which broadcast big band and instrumental music, and then La Rancherita Contenta, classic ranchera and current grupera music. In 2010, the Éxtasis Digital format returned. The station returned to grupera in 2014 as La Patrona before taking on the Ke Buena franchise later in the year. Audiorama dropped Televisa Radio franchises nationally in 2017, with XEZF becoming known as Buenisiima.
