= XHSOL-FM =

Radio station in Mexicali, Baja California, Mexico

- Mexicali, Baja California; Mexico
- Frequency: 89.9 MHz
- Branding: Super 89.9

Programming
- Format: Pop

Ownership
- Owner: Grupo Audiorama Baja California; (Frecuencias Especiales, S.A.)
- Sister stations: XEAO-AM, XEHG-AM, XEZF-AM, XHMMF-FM

History
- First air date: May 3, 1983 (concession)
- Call sign meaning: "Sol" means sun in Spanish

Technical information
- Licensing authority: CRT
- Class: B1
- ERP: 13 kW
- HAAT: 50.33 m (165.1 ft)

Links
- Website: www.audioramabc.com/supermexicali/

XHSOL-FM is a radio station in Mexicali, Baja California, Mexico. Broadcasting on 89.9 FM, XHSOL is owned by Grupo Audiorama and is known as Super with a pop format.

== History ==
Logo prior to format switch with XEHG-AM

XHSOL's concession was awarded in 1983. The station, which otherwise would have had the call sign XHFE-FM, instead took on the XHSOL call sign as it signed on under the name Stereo Sol ("Stereo Sun"). The station adopted the Ke Buena franchise format from Televisa Radio in 2004 before flipping to pop in 2006 as "89.9 Only Hits", later taking on the name "Máxima". Format changes occurred again in 2009, to La Invasora (grupera) and Tu Recuerdo (oldies) in 2011.

The present Súper pop format was first adopted in 2013, then switched places with the adult contemporary music of "Vida Elite", which had been on XHMC-FM. This swap was undone in 2016, when Súper returned to FM.
