= XEAO-AM =

Radio station in Mexicali, Baja California

- Mexicali, Baja California; Mexico
- Frequency: 910 AM
- Branding: Radio Mexicana

Programming
- Format: Regional Mexican

Ownership
- Owner: Grupo Audiorama Baja California; (La Voz de Mexicali, S.A.)
- Sister stations: XEZF-AM, XHSOL-FM, XEHG-AM, XHMMF-FM

History
- First air date: December 1, 1932

Technical information
- Licensing authority: CRT
- Class: C
- Power: 0.25 kW

Links
- Webcast: Listen live
- Website: audioramabc.com/radiomexicanamexicali

XEAO-AM is a radio station on 910 AM in Mexicali, Baja California. It is owned by Grupo Audiorama Comunicaciones and known as Radio Mexicana.

== History ==
XEAO received its first concession in 1932. It operated with 7.5 watts on 560 kHz. It was sold to Chávez y Castro in 1938, and in 1944, it was bought by Juan C. Chávez. After his death, Josefina Carvajal Vda. de Chávez and Clara Chávez de Martínez Montero became the concessionaires. They shed the station in 1967, and by 1969, it was on 910 with 250 watts.
