= WKGO =

Radio station in Murrysville, Pennsylvania

Coordinates: 40.5201°N 79.6578°W

Murrysville, Pennsylvania; United States
- Broadcast area: Eastern suburbs of the Pittsburgh metropolitan area
- Frequency: 88.1 MHz
- Branding: Easy 88.1 KGO

Programming
- Format: Easy listening

Ownership
- Owner: Broadcast Educational Communications, Inc.
- Sister stations: KQV

History
- First air date: 1994 (as WRWJ)
- Former call signs: WLGV (1993); WRWJ (1993–2016)

Technical information
- Facility ID: 26527
- Class: A
- ERP: 1 watt horizontal polarization; 1,000 watts vertical polarization
- HAAT: 92 meters (302 ft)

WKGO (88.1 FM) is a non-commercial radio station licensed to Murrysville, Pennsylvania, serving the Eastern suburbs of the Pittsburgh metropolitan area. It carries an easy listening radio format.

WKGO is owned and operated by Broadcast Educational Communications, Inc., a not-for-profit 501(c)3 corporation. The studios and offices are on Lincoln Highway in North Versailles. The transmitter is off Turkey Ridge Road in Murrysville.

As of December 19, 2019, WKGO is simulcast on KQV (1410 AM) in Pittsburgh.
