= 910 AM =

AM radio frequency

The following radio stations broadcast on AM frequency 910 kHz: 910 AM is a regional broadcast frequency. See also List of broadcast station classes.

== Argentina ==
- LR5 La Red in Buenos Aires
- LRA23 in San Juan

== Costa Rica ==
- TIUM at San Jose

== Mexico ==
- XEAO-AM in Mexicali, Baja California

== United States ==
Call sign	City of license	Facility ID	Class	Daytime power (kW)	Nighttime power (kW)	Unlimited power (kW)	Transmitter coordinates
KATH	Frisco, Texas	52342	B	1	0.5		33.215278°N 96.899167°W
KBIM	Roswell, New Mexico	34871	D	5	0.034		33.44°N 104.526389°W
KBLG	Billings, Montana	63873	D	1	0.064		45.753611°N 108.516111°W
KCJB	Minot, North Dakota	55681	B	5	5		48.2025°N 101.348333°W
KECR	El Cajon, California	20977	B	5	5		32.895556°N 116.925556°W (daytime); 32.895°N 116.925278°W (nighttime)
KGME	Phoenix, Arizona	65480	B	5	5		33.533333°N 112.121667°W
KINA	Salina, Kansas	60660	D	0.5	0.029		38.764444°N 97.541667°W
KJJQ	Volga, South Dakota	9677	B	0.5	0.5		44.250278°N 96.956111°W
KKSF	Oakland, California	59966	B	20	5		37.895833°N 122.323611°W
KMTT	Vancouver, Washington	35033	B	3.3	4.3		45.558333°N 122.4825°W
KNAF	Fredericksburg, Texas	22670	B	0.63	0.165		30.286667°N 98.882778°W
KOXR	Oxnard, California	866	B	5	1		34.282778°N 119.126667°W
KPOF	Denver, Colorado	52600	B	5	1		39.846389°N 105.033056°W
KRIO	McAllen, Texas	56477	B	5	5		26.297778°N 98.207222°W
KURY	Brookings, Oregon	35801	D	1	0.037		42.043056°N 124.243611°W
KVIS	Miami, Oklahoma	18056	B			1	36.890833°N 94.783333°W
WAAF	Scranton, Pennsylvania	36200	B	0.9	0.44		41.409444°N 75.666944°W
WAKO	Lawrenceville, Illinois	36788	D	0.5	0.05		38.723056°N 87.653611°W
WBZH	Hayward, Wisconsin	53994	D	5	0.075		45.985278°N 91.539722°W
WDOR	Sturgeon Bay, Wisconsin	17307	D	1	0.102		44.827222°N 87.3575°W
WEPG	South Pittsburg, Tennessee	40154	D	5	0.095		35.015833°N 85.7°W
WFDF	Farmington Hills, Michigan	13664	B	50	25		42.065833°N 83.394167°W
WFJX	Roanoke, Virginia	52298	D	1	0.084		37.268333°N 79.912778°W
WGTO	Cassopolis, Michigan	36612	D	1	0.035		41.953889°N 86.016389°W
WJCW	Johnson City, Tennessee	67672	B	5	1		36.410278°N 82.453611°W
WJFA	Apollo, Pennsylvania	67662	D	5	0.069		40.583611°N 79.526111°W
WLAT	New Britain, Connecticut	1911	B	5	2.8		41.716111°N 72.810278°W
WLTP	Marietta, Ohio	55182	D	5	0.013		39.363333°N 81.502778°W
WMOG	Meridian, Mississippi	48640	B	5	1		32.393611°N 88.668889°W
WMRB	Columbia, Tennessee	3405	D	0.5	0.101		35.606667°N 87.025°W
WOLI	Spartanburg, South Carolina	34388	B	3.6	0.89		35.019444°N 82.01°W
WPFB	Middletown, Ohio	54836	D	1	0.1		39.515833°N 84.351389°W
WPRP	Ponce, Puerto Rico	54475	B	4.25	4.25		17.990833°N 66.63°W
WRKL	New City, New York	50057	B	1	0.8		41.181111°N 74.048056°W
WRNL	Richmond, Virginia	11960	B	5	1.5		37.613889°N 77.514722°W
WSBA	York, Pennsylvania	73979	B	5	1		39.999167°N 76.745278°W
WSEK	Burnside, Kentucky	37024	D	0.43	0.115		37.029444°N 84.606389°W
WSRP	Jacksonville, North Carolina	18529	B	5	5		34.795833°N 77.49°W
WSUI	Iowa City, Iowa	63119	B	5	4		41.523889°N 91.503056°W
WTMZ	Dorchester Terrace–Brentwood, South Carolina	72370	D	0.5	0.085		32.871944°N 79.976111°W
WTOS	Bangor, Maine	3670	B	5	0.21		44.780833°N 68.747778°W (daytime); 44.780833°N 68.748333°W (nighttime)
WTWD	Plant City, Florida	26145	B			5	27.990556°N 82.208611°W
WUBR	Baton Rouge, Louisiana	11188	D	1.2	0.051		30.635278°N 91.165556°W
WZMG	Pepperell, Alabama	24255	D	0.65	0.056		32.657222°N 85.424167°W
