= WLSW (FM) =

Coordinates: 40.014°N 79.517°W

- Scottdale, Pennsylvania; United States
- Broadcast area: Westmoreland County, Fayette County, eastern Washington County, southeastern Allegheny County, eastern Greene County, and western Somerset County in Pennsylvania
- Frequency: 103.9 MHz
- Branding: 2WLS

Programming
- Format: Adult contemporary
- Affiliations: NBC News Radio

Ownership
- Owner: Robert and Ashley Stevens; (Broadcast Communications, Inc.)
- Sister stations: WKHB, WKVE, WXVE, WKFB, WEDO, WANB

History
- First air date: December 21, 1971; 54 years ago
- Former call signs: WLSW (1971–2017); WKHB-FM (2017–2024)
- Call sign meaning: Ludwig Stanley Wall

Technical information
- Licensing authority: FCC
- Facility ID: 36116
- Class: A
- ERP: 1,100 watts
- HAAT: 238 meters
- Repeater: 1570 WXVE (Latrobe)

Links
- Public license information: Public file; LMS

WLSW (103.9 MHz) is an adult contemporary FM radio station, licensed to the Pittsburgh suburb of Scottdale, Pennsylvania, and serving the Pittsburgh Media Market. The station is owned by and operated by Robert and Ashley Stevens, through licensee Broadcast Communications, Inc.

== History ==
WLSW first signed on the air in 1971. The station was founded by legendary Pittsburgh DJ Ludwig Stanley "Uncle Stan" Wall, who first applied for the frequency back in 1968, after pulling out of a partnership for a new AM station (known today as WKFB) in nearby Jeannette. One of the partners in that venture encouraged Wall to apply for this new frequency. Wall had also been a DJ and later general manager for WTRA (now WJFG) in Latrobe prior to putting this station on the air.

Unlike many FM stations of its time, WLSW was a standalone operation. At this time this was an oddity, because few cars in those days were equipped with FM radios, and FM was often simulcast by their AM sister operations. FM had barely begun to gain acceptance among its AM counterpart.

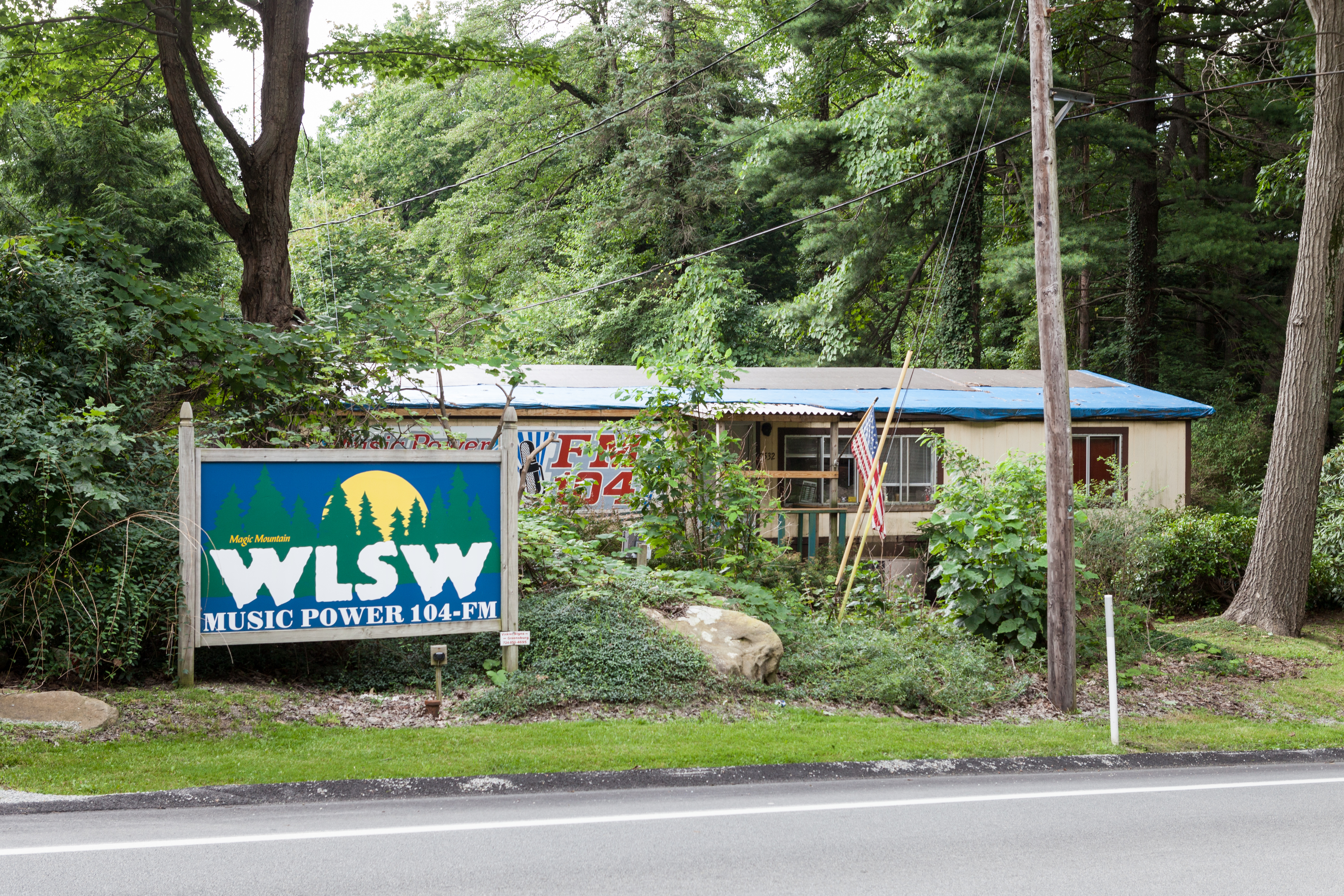
Studio on PA Route 711

Nevertheless, WLSW forged ahead, with a format mainly composed of oldies, rock, and Top 40 music. Its studios, offices, and transmitter were first located in a converted hunting cabin, then later in a converted double-wide mobile home at the top of a mountain on PA Route 711 a few miles east of Connellsville. Geographic references were often made by the DJs as "Magic Mountain", while others jokingly called the treacherous stretch of Route 711 as "Murder Mountain"—a reference to the steep climb and potentially treacherous winter conditions on this stretch of the highway.

=== WQTW: an AM station joins the fold ===
In April 1984, Wall purchased WQTW, an AM station operating at 1570 kHz 15 miles north of Connellsville in Latrobe, for $66,000. The 1,000-watt station, which had the distinction of being Latrobe's first of two radio stations, had had its studios and offices destroyed in a fire the year before and had been silent for a period of about nine months.

Wall purchased WQTW and returned it to the air, and using his same formula for WLSW's beginning, parked another converted double-wide mobile home at the transmitter site on George Street in Derry Township for the station's operations. Under Wall's ownership, WQTW operated independently of its FM sister for a period of about six years until it was decided to simulcast WLSW over its airwaves, keeping separate oldies and polka programming on the weekends, and Derry Area high school football games.

=== WLSW: keeping the oldies alive and other history ===
In 1992, Wall decided to add oldies programming to his program lineup at WLSW. Though rival oldies station WWSW in Pittsburgh played oldies, none offered pre-British invasion R&B-based music which had become legendary in Pittsburgh, largely due to the popularity of legendary Pittsburgh disc jockey Porky Chedwick.

According to a story in the Pittsburgh Tribune-Review, Wall had made the decision as he was traveling along the Pennsylvania Turnpike and had heard DJ Charlie Apple on the former WKPA on a cold November Saturday afternoon. Wall had heard Apple tell his listeners that since the station had been recently sold, and a format change was inevitable, it was his last show, thus there would be no special Christmas show as he had done in the past.

According to the interview, Wall picked up his cellular car phone and dialed the studio line. He called Apple on the air and said "You'll do it on my station". Another WKPA DJ, Jeff Allen, was also offered a show on WLSW. Other reputed oldies DJs would gradually be added, including the legendary Porky Chedwick.

Logo as "MusicPower 104"

WLSW had, in recent years, shifted its music from Top 40 to Hot Adult Contemporary and to an upbeat oldies format, adopting the moniker "MusicPower 104" in the early 1990s. Though the station was primarily music-intensive, it offered some full-service programming elements traditionally found on a typical small-market AM station, such as high school football and basketball, Pittsburgh Steelers football and Penguins Hockey.

The oldies specialty weekend programming had been successful since debuting on WLSW in 1992.

=== WKHB-FM ===
Stan Wall died June 3, 2015, after succumbing to years of health problems. Following his death, the station license was transferred to his estate, with his wife Sharon as administrator. After Sharon Wall died on June 23, 2017, it was sold to Broadcast Communications III, Inc. (BCI) with the closing of the transaction occurring on July 25, 2017.

That same day, BCI implemented a power increase to full class A equivalent facilities which was previously applied for by FCC application approximately 3 months before the closing date while the parties were awaiting approval of the license transfer. Additionally that same day, BCI implemented a new Adult Contemporary format branded as "103.9 KHB", and began broadcasting from new studio facilities. On August 2, 2017, the call sign was changed from WLSW to WKHB-FM. The WLSW call sign returned on December 15, 2024. In late April 2025, the brand became '2WLS', remaining with the AC format.
