= WANB =

- Waynesburg, Pennsylvania; United States
- Broadcast area: Greene County
- Frequency: 1210 kHz
- Branding: Cool Country WANB or 105.1 1210 WANB

Programming
- Format: Country

Ownership
- Owner: Broadcast Communications, Inc.
- Sister stations: WKVE, WLSW, WKHB, WKFB, WEDO, WXVE

History
- First air date: September 26, 1956
- Former frequencies: 1580 kHz
- Call sign meaning: Waynesburg (city of license)

Technical information
- Licensing authority: FCC
- Facility ID: 32211
- Class: D
- Power: 5,000 watts (day); 710 watts (critical hours)
- Transmitter coordinates: 39°52′12″N 80°8′1″W
- Translators: 105.1 W286AL (106.3 MHz) W292FM (Waynesburg)

Links
- Public license information: Public file; LMS

WANB (1210 AM) is a Country formatted broadcast radio station licensed to Waynesburg, Pennsylvania, and serves southwestern Pennsylvania and portions of West Virginia and Ohio. WANB is owned and operated by Broadcast Communications, Inc.

== History ==
WANB signed on the air on September 26, 1956, at 1580 kilohertz and a daytime power output of 250 watts. For many years, this was the only radio station on the air serving Greene County. From the time of its inception until 1991, WANB broadcast from the First Federal bank building on East High Street in downtown Waynesburg. The licensee was Commonwealth Broadcasters, Inc. and would remain so until 1975, though owner principals would change over the course of its history.

George McGary and his wife, Pat, moved from New York to Waynesburg to become the first station managers at WANB. In the early days, George spent most of his time canvassing for ads to keep the station going. Al Harvey and John Biery Jr. were two of the early D.J.s. Lucinda (Toddy) Greenlee was the sales person.

In the 1950s and 1960s, it was common for unknown recording artists to show up at the station and ask D.J.s to plug their latest record. One singer who stopped at WANB was Bobby Vinton from Canonsburg, Pennsylvania, who was plugging "High Steppin Majorette" a couple of years before he had the first of many hits including "Roses Are Red" and "Blue Velvet".

One of the notable shows in the early days of the station was "Trading Post" where local townspeople could call in and advertise their household goods for sale. In the 1960s, the final hour of the station day was called "Serenade to Sunset" and consisted of playing full instrumental albums from such artists as Percy Faith, Mantovanni, and the like. There was no DJ or commercials during this final hour.

Other D.J.s in the 1960s were Paul Merryman and Bill Parker among others.

In 1964, Jim and Frances Pattison moved to Waynesburg to assume ownership of the station. They performed many duties at the station, from sales to broadcasting. Their son, Tom, had a Saturday afternoon "psychedelic show" that was quite different from the music that was played the remainder of the week. Local musician Todd Tamanend Clark was frequently in attendance when Tom Pattison was on the air.

In 1970, the 250-watt station was purchased from Pattison and his board of investors, by Arnold W.(Abe)Albright and Richard Glenn Klopsch, principals in AKZ Inc. Albright, a former News Director with the "Group W" Westinghouse Broadcasting Company and NBC affiliates including KDKA in Pittsburgh and WIND in Chicago, and Klopsch, a newscaster and radio personality, revamped the struggling station by expanding the local market. They increased local sports coverage, particularly Waynesburg College Football and Basketball, and built community interest by covering the Greene County Fair, demolition derby at the County’s Fair Grounds, the Carmichaels Coal Show and the 4-H farm and horse show in Western Greene County. Under Albright's management, the station became the Southwest Pennsylvania broadcast outlet for Pittsburgh Pirate Network Baseball games and the Pittsburgh Steelers football. They contracted with NBC for news on the hour and special programing (they were the only NBC affiliate with just 250 watts) and followed with local news.

Frustrated by the restrictive daytime license and 250-watt transmitter, Albright began the process of applying to the FCC (Federal Communications Commission) for an increase in power. In early 1976, Albright entered into an agreement with Kenneth R. Strawberry, of Uniontown, an employee at the US Department of State. Strawberry proposed using his connections at other Government agencies to lobby the FCC for approval to increase wattage power and further expand market coverage. Strawberry's efforts resulted in the FCC's granting an increase in power to 500-watts on April 27, 1976. The Strawberry/Albright partnership applied for an FM Stereo Broadcast license which was relocated from Fairmont, West Virginia, on April 21, 1978, permitting WANB to broadcast a full 24-hours. WANB was joined by a simulcast FM sister station on April 21, 1978; enabling listeners to enjoy local radio service after the AM was forced to leave the air at sundown. with the Albright/Strawberry agreement, the company name changed from Commonwealth Broadcasters to WANB, Inc.

The move required the purchase of new transmitting equipment. Strawberry advanced funds for the purchase, increasing his financial interest in the operation and ultimately forcing Albright out of ownership. On October 24, 1978, the FCC granted WANB 1000-watts of power. In 1980, housing for the transmitting equipment was constructed on land purchased south of Waynesburg near I-79 and broadcasting began from the 500-foot guyed steel tower. With its increased capacity, the station now covered Greene and adjacent counties 24 hours a day and the signal reached a significantly expanded advertising market.

Pushed out of ownership in the spring of 1984, General Manager and co-owner Abe Albright sued Ken Strawberry in County Court alleging an unfair division of assets and essentially a hostile takeover of WANB radio. The lawsuit ultimately failed and Albright relinquished ownership, replaced as General Manager by John Loeper, a radio personality in both York and suburban D.C. Loeper had been a football and basketball play by play announcer at Waynesburg University.

Loeper, after acting as general manager of WANB for many years, left the station in 1990 to become the minority partner in JJG Communications, which purchased Washington County competitor WKEG. The venture was unsuccessful, and Loeper left the radio business altogether the following year. He was replaced by Judy Rastoka, who held the position for approximately 15 years after his departure.

In 1991, WANB vacated its longtime home in the First Federal building (which had begun to fall into disrepair) and moved to a spacious new, modern, all-steel building at its transmitter site just south of Waynesburg and off I-79. Engineering personnel had designed the building with expansion in mind if that were ever the goal of ownership present or future.

== Sale to Broadcast Communications, Inc. ==
Majority owner principals Joseph F. Hennessey, a Massachusetts-based attorney, and engineer Ken Strawberry, who together made up WANB, Inc. (though Hennessey himself was listed as licensee) decided to sell the station for $850,000 in December 2001 to Broadcast Communications, Inc.; a Westmoreland County, Pennsylvania-based company headed by Pittsburgh broadcaster Bob Stevens.

Stevens had previously built and owned WKYN in St. Marys, Pennsylvania; and later sold it in the mid-1990s to buy WHJB and WBCW, in Greensburg and Jeannette respectively; wishing to own a station closer to his hometown.

== WANB today ==
WANB has been a simulcast outlet of its FM sister almost entirely since the FM station's debut in 1978. It has never had nighttime power authorization and had experimented with separate programming shortly after both stations moved to its present location at its transmitter. For a couple of years, WANB programmed a format of Southern Gospel and Contemporary Christian music, neither of which were successful, and WANB returned to being a simulcast-only station.

WANB has been a proven testing ground for up-and-coming young radio talent that moved on to bigger markets. Former morning DJ Drew Gordon moved on to legendary country music powerhouse Q102 in DuBois, Pennsylvania; and former news director Lori Salva-Houy moved on to field reporting duties at WPXI-TV in Pittsburgh.

WANB was granted a construction permit in 2006 to move to a lower dial position of 1210 kHz with a power increase to 5,000 watts. The station began broadcasting on its new frequency on December 31, 2009.
