= WKVE =

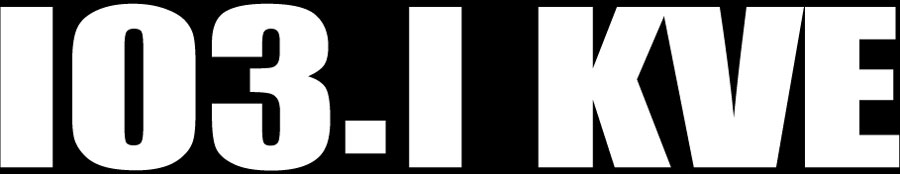
- Mount Pleasant, Pennsylvania; United States
- Broadcast area: Southwestern Pennsylvania
- Frequency: 103.1 MHz
- Branding: KVE

Programming
- Format: Album oriented rock

Ownership
- Owner: Broadcast Communications, Inc.
- Sister stations: WXVE, WLSW, WKHB, WKFB, WEDO, WANB

History
- First air date: 1978 (as WANB-FM)
- Former call signs: WANB-FM (1978–2009)

Technical information
- Licensing authority: FCC
- Facility ID: 32210
- Class: B1
- ERP: 4,400 watts
- HAAT: 244 meters (801 ft)
- Transmitter coordinates: 39°54′49.6″N 79°37′57.4″W

Links
- Public license information: Public file; LMS
- Website: www.kve.fm

WKVE (103.1 FM "KVE") is an album oriented rock formatted broadcast radio station licensed to Mount Pleasant, Pennsylvania, serving Westmoreland County, Fayette County and Southwestern Pennsylvania in particular. WKVE is owned and operated by Broadcast Communications, Inc.

== History ==
Formerly WANB-FM, the station had been simulcasting the broadcast day of sister station WANB. The station was previously licensed to Waynesburg, Pennsylvania, USA, and obtained a construction permit to change its community of license to Mount Pleasant, Pennsylvania, raise power, and move its tower to better serve southwestern Pennsylvania.

On March 9, 2009, the call letters were changed to WKVE. One year later, on March 9, 2010, the station silenced its Waynesburg transmitter and began broadcasting from its new facilities, repeating a "loop" directing former WANB listeners to that station's other frequencies, 1210 AM and 105.1 FM, and announcing the current format which debuted on May 4, 2010, on 103.1.

== Call sign ==
The WKVE callsign was originally used at WDDH in St. Mary's, Pennsylvania. That station was built in 1986 as WKYN by Robert & Ashley Stevens and owned and operated under their corporate entity Broadcast Communications, Inc. In the early 1990s WKYN became WKVE and aired the "KVE" album oriented rock format. After the Stevens sold WKVE in the mid-1990s to begin acquiring stations in their hometown area, of Westmoreland County, Pennsylvania, the callsign was then subsequently used by Educational Media Foundation at one of their K-LOVE format stations, which is now WKVK, licensed to Semora, North Carolina. Educational Media Foundation transferred the callsign WKVE back to Broadcast Communications, Inc. for use at what was then WANB-FM, which became WKVE when a major facility upgrade, including the move from Greene County to Westmoreland County was implemented. Though similar, WKVE's callsign is not a "nod" to nearby WDVE in Pittsburgh. The "KVE" format is a true album oriented rock format that is programmed similar to the programming style of album oriented rock formats that were very popular in the 1970s and 1980s in particular. WKVE plays some 1990s, 2000s and 2010s rock bands such as Counting Crows, Shinedown, Foo Fighters, Candlebox, 3 Doors Down, Pearl Jam and other bands that can be found on the WKVE website.
