= WZUM-FM =

- Bethany, West Virginia; United States
- Broadcast area: Greater Pittsburgh
- Frequency: 88.1 MHz
- Branding: The Pittsburgh Jazz Channel

Programming
- Format: NPR, jazz

Ownership
- Owner: Pittsburgh Public Media
- Sister stations: WZUM

History
- First air date: 1967 (as WVBC)
- Former call signs: WVBC (1967–2013); WYZR (2013–2016)
- Call sign meaning: Taken from sister station WZUM

Technical information
- Licensing authority: FCC
- Facility ID: 4954
- Class: A
- ERP: 1,100 watts
- HAAT: 125 meters (410 ft)
- Transmitter coordinates: 40°12′58.00″N 80°33′31.00″W

Links
- Public license information: Public file; LMS
- Webcast: Listen Live
- Website: wzum.org

WZUM-FM (88.1 MHz) is a jazz radio station licensed in Bethany, West Virginia, United States, and serving the Greater Pittsburgh area. The station is owned by Pittsburgh Public Media. WZUM-FM is run by former staff members of former Pittsburgh radio station WDUQ (which was sold in 2011 by Duquesne University and is now WESA, broadcasting a mostly NPR news/talk format with a small portion of jazz remaining). The station previously operated under the callsign WVBC and was a service of Bethany College, a private liberal arts college in the town of Bethany.

WVBC relaunched as WYZR on September 1, 2013, as a result of a November 2012 announcement by Pittsburgh Public Media (a group who unsuccessfully bid on WDUQ with the intent to retain its news-jazz-NPR format as is) to purchase the license of WVBC as a pretext to returning jazz to Pittsburgh airwaves in partnership with the Pittsburgh Jazz Channel, an online jazz radio station founded by the former WDUQ staffers shortly after the WDUQ sale and format change. The WVBC sale finalized in May 2013.

The station changed its call sign to the current WZUM-FM on May 12, 2016.

The station has an approved construction permit to raise power to 10,000 watts directional which will put a strong signal over Wheeling, West Virginia; Weirton and Steubenville as well as Washington, Pennsylvania. The signal should also reach Pittsburgh's North Hills area.

This station is associated with WZUM (AM) 1550 Braddock and FM translator W266CV on 101.1 MHz.
