= WZUM (1590 AM) =

Radio station in Carnegie, Pennsylvania (1964–2010)

Coordinates: 40°25′28″N 80°05′05″W

Carnegie, Pennsylvania; United States
- Broadcast area: Pittsburgh, Pennsylvania
- Frequency: 1590 kHz
- Branding: "1590 WZUM, The Promise"

Programming
- Format: Defunct

Ownership
- Owner: Sovereign City Radio Services LLC

History
- First air date: 1964
- Last air date: March 2010
- Former call signs: WCNE (1961); WZUM (1961–1975); WPLW (1975–1998); WZUM (1998–2013)

Technical information
- Class: D
- Power: 1,000 Watts daytime 24 Watts nighttime

WZUM (1590 AM) was a radio station that was located in Carnegie, Pennsylvania. It was owned by Sovereign City Radio Services LLC.

== History ==
Logo used under Relevant Radio Programming

After originally being organized under the call letters WCNE, station owners changed calls to WZUM before being licensed in 1964. The station signed on as an R&B and top 40 station, partly owned by popular Pittsburgh polka bandleader James Psihoulis "Jimmy Pol".

During the 1970s, WZUM was a freeform AOR outlet, operating from 10:00 a.m. until sunset, (broadcasting polkas in the morning from sunrise). "Powerful" Paul Perry, son of Pittsburgh TV personality Nick Perry, was one of the freeform disc jockeys, along with Kit Baron, "Laid Back" Larry Allen and Mark Wallace.

WZUM switched to religious programming under the WPLW callsign in 1975 after its purchase by Robert Hickling. In 1998, following Hickling's death, it was sold to Pittsburgh-area broadcaster Mike Horvath. Returned to the WZUM call letters, the station changed its format to smooth jazz, but went dark after just one year. The station subsequently returned after a major transmitter and studio overhaul, operating with time-brokered programming and then oldies, with Catholic programming added in 2002. Upon purchase of the station, Starboard converted it entirely to Catholic programming under the Relevant Radio branding.

In recent years, WZUM applied for an upgrade to its signal, which would have given the station minimal night power.

Relevant Radio ceased programming on WZUM by early 2009. In its place, WZUM aired an Easy Listening format, and was in talks with the Delmarva Educational Association, an owner of a small group of religious stations in Virginia and Florida, for a more stable format or possible sale.

By May 23, 2009, the station dropped its easy listening format for Gospel and picked up the branding "1590 WZUM, The Promise".

The station ceased operations in March 2010, with the FCC approving a special temporary authority a month later for the station to remain silent. The station's license was cancelled by the FCC on May 29, 2013.
