= WKFB =

- Jeannette, Pennsylvania; United States
- Broadcast area: Pittsburgh metropolitan area
- Frequency: 770 kHz
- Branding: 97.5 770 KFB

Programming
- Format: Oldies

Ownership
- Owner: Broadcast Communications, Inc.
- Sister stations: WLSW, WKHB, WKVE, WXVE, WEDO, WANB

History
- First air date: January 28, 1974 (as WBCW at 1530)
- Former call signs: WBCW (1974–1999); WKTW (1999–2004)
- Former frequencies: 1530 kHz (1974–2004)
- Call sign meaning: "Keeping Fun in Broadcasting"

Technical information
- Licensing authority: FCC
- Facility ID: 10026
- Class: D
- Power: 750 watts (daytime)
- Transmitter coordinates: 40°17′20.25″N 79°42′3.16″W
- Translators: 97.5 W248AR (Monroeville); 105.1 W286CZ (Greensburg)

Links
- Public license information: Public file; LMS
- Website: WKFB Facebook

WKFB (770 AM) is a radio station licensed to Jeannette, Pennsylvania, that serves the greater Pittsburgh area. The station also broadcasts on 97.5 FM. Known as "97.5 770 KFB", the station airs an oldies format featuring music from the 1950s, 1960s, and the early to mid 1970s. The station is very popular with the audience that prefers the older music and is the only station in southwestern Pennsylvania that plays an oldies format. WKFB is owned and operated by Broadcast Communications, Inc.

== History ==
=== Beginnings as WBCW ===
For many years this station was known as WBCW, with the call letters standing for We're Broadcasting (from) Central Westmoreland (County). The groundwork for WBCW was first laid on March 30, 1967, when a partnership known as Albert A. Calisti and Associates filed an application for construction of the new station. Albert A. Calisti and his wife Verna each held 42.1% ownership, while partners L. Stanley Wall and John Seramet each held a 7.9% ownership stake. In August 1967, WHJB, Inc., the licensee of competing stations known then as WHJB(AM) and WOKU(FM), filed a petition to deny the license to Albert A. Calisti and Associates. In January 1968, the Albert A. Calisti and Associates partnership was dissolved. A new partnership, Central Westmoreland Broadcasting Company was formed with the same investors except Albert Calisti. Instead, Mrs. Calisti assumed control of what would have been her husband's stake in the company. Wall withdrew his ownership interest in June 1968 to pursue the application of an FM license in Scottdale. That license, known today as WLSW, ultimately came to fruition for Wall in 1971. That same year, the FCC granted the license to Central Westmoreland Broadcasting Company.

The station originally operated at 1530 kHz with a daytime-only power of 1,000 watts, with 250 watts during critical hours, barely reaching the fringes of Westmoreland County.

Al Calisti did the engineering and hosted a provocative local talk show called "People Talk" weekday afternoons from 1:00 p.m. to 3:00 p.m. Visitors to the Westmoreland County Court House in nearby Greensburg could hear WBCW playing up and down the halls in various row offices. It was well known that various politically involved citizens including those at the court house who held political positions listened to the show daily to make sure that Calisti was not talking about them. He was known to call certain people "kooks", and callers with third-party information that he found questionable, he would refute with "don't you believe it."

The show was so provocative that Verna Calisti found it necessary to keep the front entrance door to the radio station locked during most afternoons, fearing that unwanted visitors who were upset with Al's show would show up and cause an unwanted incident. But Al had a lighter side too, hosting a weekly polka music show on Saturdays called "Happy Music for Happy People". Either way, Al definitely was a character and made a lot of people smile. Verna Calisti kept the books and sold airtime, and in the early years of the station operation their daughter Jacqueline Rae served as program director. The station had a limited number of other full-time and/or part-time employees outside of the Calisti family. Clair Thomas, who served as the station's news and music director and who hosted a daily music show and daily talk show and who did the noon news block as well as hosted tradio during the noon hour was part of the operation during the 1980s and 1990s. Another notable WBCW personality was Mark Kuhns, also known as Marko Polka who handled various shifts, usually after 3:00 p.m. during the 1980s and 1990s.

The original format consisted of adult contemporary music from sign-on to 10:00 a.m. then a talk show from 10:00 a.m. to 12:00 p.m. (noon), a noon news block from 12:00 pm to 12:35 p.m. followed by tradio until 1:00 p.m. then "People Talk" from 1:00 p.m. to 3:00 p.m. with music until sign-off at sundown which also included a 5:00 p.m. news block when daytime operational hours permitted the station to be on the air. The Calistis maintained ownership of the station which evolved to a full-time talk format with local and syndicated talk until 1998, when they sold it to Broadcast Communications, Inc. which had acquired Greensburg-based 620 WHJB (now WKHB)two years earlier in 1996. Al Calisti died of cancer seven years later.

=== Sale to Broadcast Communications ===
Under the new ownership, the station moved from its original location at 111 South Fourth Street in Jeannette to WHJB's building at 245 Brown Street in Greensburg. A frequency change to 770 was made in early 2004, giving the station much better coverage of the Pittsburgh market, allowing the station to reach all of Westmoreland, Fayette, Washington, and Allegheny counties as well as parts of Armstrong, Indiana, Somerset, Greene, Beaver, and Butler counties too. The call letters WKFB were selected to be similar to sister station WKHB.

== On-air hosts and programs ==
The oldies format of 97.5 770 KFB features various well-known oldies DJ's.

"The Frankie Day Oldies Show" featuring Frankie Day airs weekday mornings from 8:00 a.m. to 10:00 a.m. followed by "Big Ray's Blast from the Past" from 10:00 a.m. to Noon with a variety of DJ's including Glenn Raymer, Corvette Mick, or Gary Ed. From Noon on through the rest of the day, the evening, overnight, and early morning until 8:00 a.m., Bill Korch and Michael J Daniels are heard on the station as the oldies continue 24/7.

The weekend oldies shows are also very heavily listened to. The various oldies shows on Saturdays include:"The Rockin' Golden Oldies Show" with Glen Raymer and Corvette Mick from 7:00 a.m.- 10:00 a.m., "The Library of Golden Oldies" with Dr. Doo-Wop & Ms. Shoo-Bop (Dennis & Becky Spinella) from 10:00 a.m. - 12:00 p.m., "Sounds of Sinatra" with Bo Wagner from 12:00 p.m. to 2:00 p.m., and "The Frankie Day Oldies Show" featuring Frankie Day from 2:00 p.m. to 5:00 p.m.

The Sunday oldies shows include: "Georgie O's Oldies Cafe" with George Rocelle & Gary Ed from 8:00 a.m. to Noon and "The Nite Train Vault Of Memories Show" with Kid Doo Wop (Jared Panek) from 5:00 p.m. - 8:00 p.m.

Sunday ministry and ethnic programming include: "Song & Verse" with Stan & Bonnie Detar from 12:15 pm to 12:30 pm, The First Presbyterian Church of Jeannette from 12:30 pm to 1:00 pm, and "Sounds of the Tamburitza" with Michael Hogel from 1:00 p.m. to 3:00 p.m.

== Translators ==
Call sign	Frequency	City of license	FID	ERP (W)	HAAT	Class	Transmitter coordinates	FCC info
W248AR	97.5 FM	Monroeville, Pennsylvania	140980	210	148.2 m (486 ft)	D	40°17′20″N 79°42′3″W	LMS
W286CZ	105.1 FM	Greensburg, Pennsylvania	141826	120	0 m (0 ft)	D	40°17′20″N 79°42′3″W	LMS
