= WKHB (AM) =

Radio station in Irwin, Pennsylvania, United States

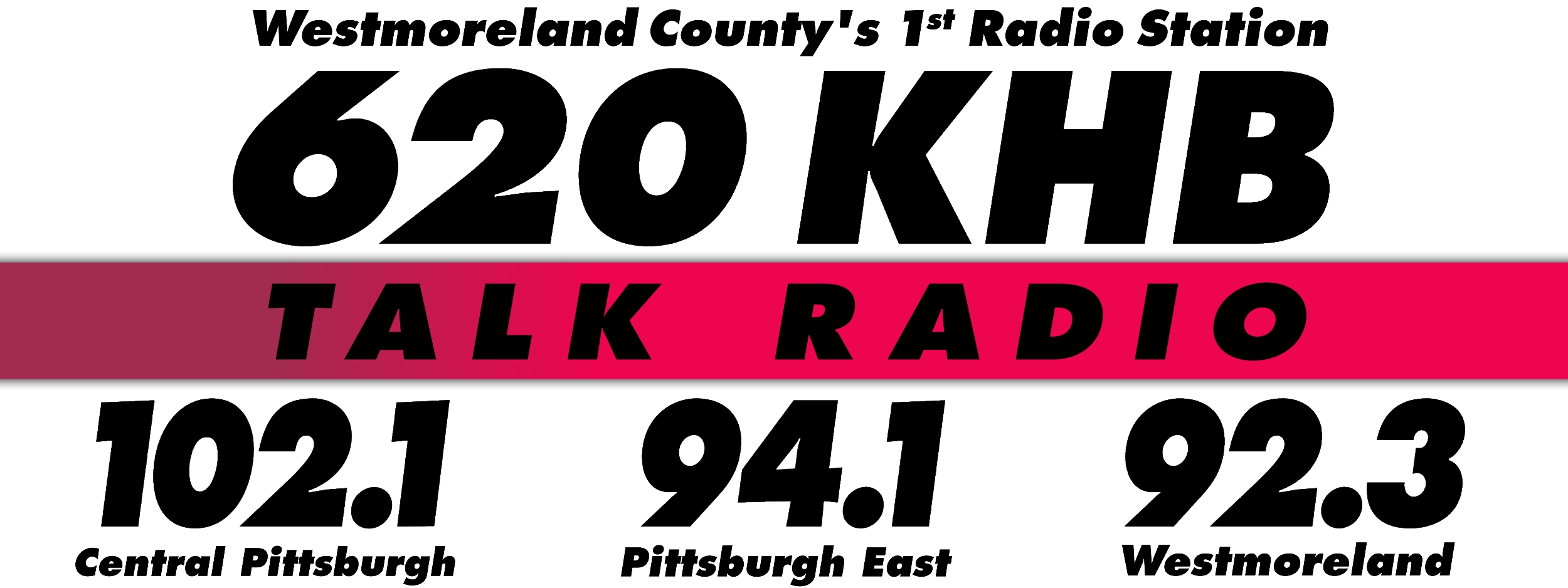

Irwin, Pennsylvania; United States
- Broadcast area: Pittsburgh metropolitan area
- Frequency: 620 kHz
- Branding: 620 KHB

Programming
- Format: Brokered programming (days); Oldies (nights)

Ownership
- Owner: Broadcast Communications, Inc.
- Sister stations: WANB, WEDO, WKFB, WKVE, WLSW, WXVE

History
- First air date: October 28, 1934 (as WHJB, Greensburg)

Technical information
- Licensing authority: FCC
- Facility ID: 72297
- Class: D
- Power: 5,500 watts day; 50 watts night
- Transmitter coordinates: 40°17′20.25″N 79°42′3.16″W
- Translators: 92.3 W222CB (Irwin); 94.1 W231BM (Pittsburgh); 102.1 W271CW (Pittsburgh)

Links
- Public license information: Public file; LMS
- Website: www.bciradio.net/wkhbam/index.html

WKHB (620 kHz "KHB Radio") is a commercial AM radio station licensed to Irwin, Pennsylvania, and serving Greater Pittsburgh. It is owned by Broadcast Communications, Inc., and it carries a brokered programming radio format. During the day, hosts pay the station for time on the air and may advertise their products or services during their shows. At night, WKHB plays oldies music.

By day, WKHB transmits with 5,500 watts, but at night, to prevent interference to other stations on 620 AM, WKHB reduces power to only 50 watts. The transmitter is off Turkey Farm Road in Wendel. Programming is simulcast on three FM translators: 102.1 in Central Allegheny County, 94.1 in Pittsburgh and 92.3 in Westmoreland County.

== History ==
=== Beginnings as WHJB ===
The station began as WHJB, formerly licensed to Greensburg, Pennsylvania. It signed on the air on October 28, 1934. WHJB began as a daytimer, operating at a power of 250 watts, non-directional, and required to go off the air at night. The station's call letters stood for founder H.J. Brennen. doing business as Pittsburgh Radio Supply House, broadcasting from a studio in the Penn Albert Hotel at 128 North Pennsylvania Avenue in Greensburg.

WHJB, as the first radio station on the air in suburban Pittsburgh, experienced steady growth and prospered over its formative years, getting nighttime power authorization by 1955, as well as a daytime power increase, with power settings at 1,000 watts during the day, and 500 watts at night, adopting a directional antenna pattern with changing patterns for night and day operation. By 1960, the name of the licensee had changed its name to WHJB, Inc., though the station still was owned by the Brennen family. That changed in 1962 when control was transferred to others after the Brennen family's interests were sold to Robert Burstein, and then to general manager Melvin Goldberg by 1967.

=== WHJB-FM signs on ===
On November 1, 1964, WHJB welcomed WHJB-FM, its like-named FM sister station to the air. Though the stations shared identical call letters, they were initially programmed separately, until 1967, when several changes took place.

That year, WHJB and its FM sister, by this time named WOKU-FM, now simulcasting for half the broadcast day, moved to new studios and offices at 227 West Otterman Street in Greensburg. The stations moved to another location at 245 Brown Street near the Greensburg city limits in 1974, where they remained for the rest of the 20th century.

As "Disco 107" in 1979, WOKU won an award from Billboard magazine as "Large-Market Disco Station of the Year".

In 1980, WHJB upgraded its transmitting facilities again, increasing its power to 2,500 watts daytime and 500 watts at night, which it kept until shortly after its sale in 1996. WHJB's antenna array along U.S. Route 30 (four towers for the AM directional pattern, plus a fifth tower for the FM, later used as an auxiliary site) could be seen overlooking Greensburg for many years, but came down after the sale was completed.

=== 1996 sale ===
The station was sold in 1996 to Broadcast Communications, Inc.

Broadcast Communications, Inc. moved WHJB's transmitter site closer to Pittsburgh, raised its daytime power twice, and changed its community of license to Irwin, Pennsylvania, a nearby suburb of Pittsburgh. WHJB had always been primarily a Westmoreland County, Pennsylvania radio station while WKHB with its higher power and closer tower, aspires to serve the tri-state greater Pittsburgh area.

Although the station continued to operate as a music-formatted, stand-alone AM outlet for several more years, the call letter change to WKHB in 1999 was more or less concurrent with a format switch to all paid programming. Music continues to air in the station's off-peak hours, 7:30 p.m. to 6:30 a.m., consisting of classic hits from the mid-1960s to the mid-1980s.

=== Program hosts ===
Morning host and station manager Barry Banker celebrated 40 years with the station in 2006. Banker retired and was replaced in morning drive by Bill Korch from nearby WEDO.

Veteran Pittsburgh on-air personality and programmer Clarke Ingram was associated with the station (and sister station WKFB) as Program Director and Operations Manager for several years in the mid-2000s.

Caleb Michaels and Michael J. Daniels appear at various times, often at night, doing the classic hits format, which at times is simulcast with sister station 103.9 WLSW.

KHB also features a variety of talk programming including: health, ministry, and local issues. KHB has an extended lineup of weekend polka shows that air on Saturdays and Sundays.

== Translators ==
Call sign	Frequency	City of license	FID	ERP (W)	Class	Transmitter coordinates	FCC info
W222CB	92.3 FM	Irwin, Pennsylvania	156023	100	D	40°17′20″N 79°42′3″W	LMS
W231BM	94.1 FM	Pittsburgh, Pennsylvania	148552	200	D	40°21′51.2″N 79°48′45.2″W	LMS
W271CW	102.1 FM	Pittsburgh, Pennsylvania	158245	25	D	40°26′46.2″N 79°57′50.2″W	LMS

== Sources ==
- 1945 Broadcasting Yearbook
- 1956 Broadcasting Yearbook
- 1960 Broadcasting Yearbook
- 1963 Broadcasting Yearbook
- 1965 Broadcasting Yearbook
- 1967 Broadcasting Yearbook
- 1971 Broadcasting Yearbook
- 1975 Broadcasting Yearbook
- 1981 Broadcasting Yearbook
