= Art Pallan =

American journalist (1923–2007)

- Born: Arthur E. Pallan; May 11, 1923; Braddock, Pennsylvania, U.S.
- Died: January 22, 2007 (aged 83)
- Occupation: Radio personality
- Spouse: Agnes
- Children: 4

Arthur E. Pallan (May 11, 1923 – January 22, 2007) was an American radio celebrity in Pittsburgh, Pennsylvania, USA.

== Biography ==
Born in Braddock, Pennsylvania, he graduated from Brentwood High School. He landed his first radio job at WWSW. Upon graduating from high school, Pallan took an office job with Procter & Gamble. But he dreamed of being in radio and would spend his lunch hours watching the announcers working at KDKA and WWSW. He auditioned several times at WWSW and was finally hired when the station had a shortage of announcers because of World War II. He served in the military himself and was a decorated veteran. Pallan moved over to KDKA in 1956 where his popularity would grow in the Pittsburgh market during the 1960s. Like Cordic, Pallan was mentored by Bill Cullen, who was on staff at WWSW before he left for New York and found national fame as a game show personality.

Pallan spent much of his time at KDKA assigned to the midday slot. He featured a cheerful, upbeat style and referred to himself as "Your Pal Pallan", and often appeared on television promotional announcements for KDKA in his trademark white goatee and brightly colored Hawaiian print or bowling shirts. Pallan was the first disc jockey to play The Skyliners' "Since I Don't Have You," airing the record on December 26, 1958, at precisely 10:20 a.m., the time designed to coincide with KDKA's 1020 position on the AM dial. Pallan was also close to singer Bobby Vinton and regularly featured Vinton's music on his show.

When Rege Cordic left KDKA for Los Angeles in 1965, Pallan and former Cordic sidekick Bob Trow were given the morning show. "Pallan and Trow, Two For The Show" debuted on November 29, 1965, and ran through April 1968. At that time KDKA changed the direction of the morning show by hiring Jack Bogut from Salt Lake City. Pallan then returned to the familiar midday slot, where he spent the rest of his KDKA career. He retired in February 1985, and Doug Hawkes took over the time slot. Pallan said his favorite broadcasts were the Christmas season shows that KDKA originated daily from the downtown department store windows as a fund-raiser for Pittsburgh's Children's Hospital.

Pallan was also a singer who cut several records in the 1950s. In 2014 on his 7th year death anniversary, his recording of the song "Land of Dreams" was published on YouTube. He had a style that was similar to that of Bing Crosby. He had a gift for dialects and was an exceptional joke teller.

Pallan and his wife Agnes had three daughters and a son.
