= WBZZ (disambiguation) =

WBZZ may refer to:

- WBZZ, a radio station (100.7 FM) licensed to serve New Kensington, Pennsylvania, United States
- WQBK-FM, a radio station (105.7 FM) in Malta, New York, United States, licensed as WBZZ from 2006 to 2011
- WJBR (AM), a radio station (1010 AM) in Seffner, Florida, United States, licensed as WBZZ from 2004 to 2006
- KDKA-FM, a radio station (93.7 FM) in Pittsburgh, Pennsylvania, United States, licensed as WBZZ from 1981 to 2004
