= WTAE =

WTAE may refer to:

- WTAE-TV, an ABC affiliated station located in Pittsburgh, Pennsylvania
- The former call sign, or a derivative thereof, of the following stations:
  - WPGP, a radio station (1250 AM) in Pittsburgh previously known as WTAE
  - WKST-FM, a radio station (96.1 FM) in Pittsburgh previously known as WTAE-FM
