= WBZZ =

Radio station in New Kensington–Pittsburgh, Pennsylvania

- New Kensington, Pennsylvania; United States
- Broadcast area: Pittsburgh metro area
- Frequency: 100.7 MHz (HD Radio)
- Branding: 100.7 Star

Programming
- Language: English
- Format: Hot AC
- Subchannels: HD2: Channel Q

Ownership
- Owner: Audacy, Inc.; (Audacy License, LLC)
- Sister stations: KDKA; KDKA-FM; WAMO; WDSY-FM

History
- First air date: February 4, 1963
- Former call signs: WYDD (1963–1966); WNUF (1966–1984); WWCL (1984–1985); WXXP (1985–1988); WMXP (1988–1993); WQKB (1993–1998); WZPT (1998–2011)
- Call sign meaning: Call sign "parking" from the former WBZZ (93.7 FM); now KDKA-FM

Technical information
- Licensing authority: FCC
- Facility ID: 20351
- Class: B
- ERP: 14,500 watts
- HAAT: 280 meters (920 ft)
- Transmitter coordinates: 40.4723°N 79.9945°W

Links
- Public license information: Public file; LMS
- Webcast: Listen live (via Audacy)
- Website: www.audacy.com/starpittsburgh

WBZZ (100.7 FM, "100.7 Star") is a Hot AC radio station licensed to New Kensington, Pennsylvania, targeting Pittsburgh, Pennsylvania, and owned by Audacy, Inc. Its transmitter is located in Pittsburgh's Spring Hill district and its studios are located west of downtown.

Due to the presence of co-channel WMMS in Cleveland, WBZZ only partially covers the northwestern Pittsburgh radio market.

== History ==
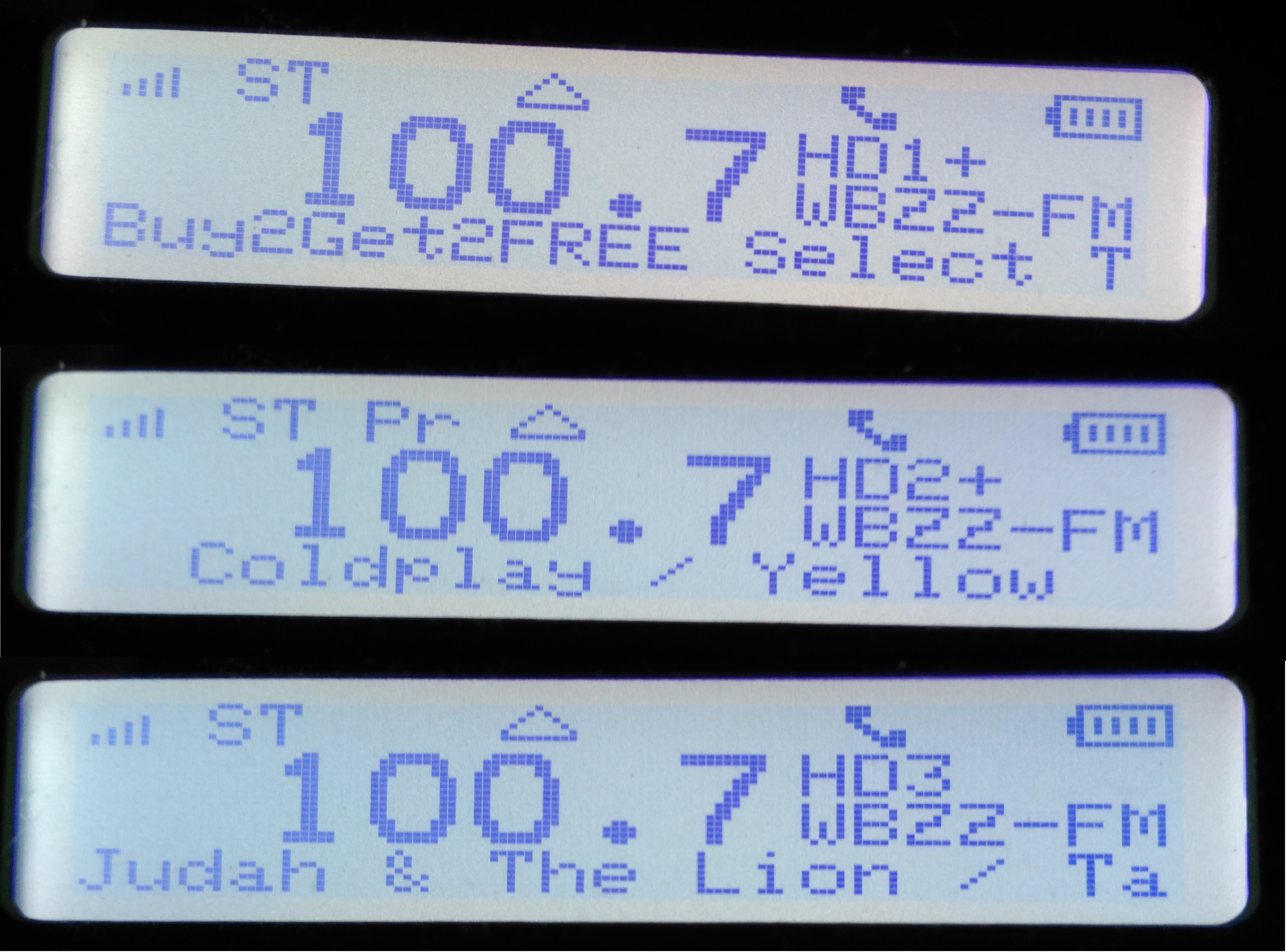
WBZZ's HD Radio Channels on a SPARC Radio with PSD and EAS.

=== Beginnings as WYDD ===
100.7 originally signed on the air on February 4, 1963 as WYDD with a power of 10,000 watts in New Kensington, operating as the FM sister station of WKPA, also licensed to New Kensington. In 1967 another FM license, WPGH-FM, was dropped in Pittsburgh at 104.7. The owner of WYDD, Gateway Broadcasting Enterprises, applied for 104.7 and the FCC granted the license. WYDD assumed 104.7, changed its city of license to Pittsburgh, and increased its power to 50,000 watts.

A condition of the grant was that Gateway would have to sell the 100.7 frequency to stay compliant with FCC rules and regulations at the time that forbade a licensee to own more than one FM and one AM in a single market.

=== As WNUF ===
Because New Kensington was part of the Pittsburgh market, 100.7 was sold to Millvale-based publisher Milton Hammond, who used the channel for WNUF. The city of license remained New Kensington with a new transmitter site in Russellton. The owner tried to get the call-letters WFUN, but since it was already assigned to another station, the station settled for "fun" backwards, hence the WNUF call-letters. During the construction phrase of WNUF, an agreement was reached with WOMP-FM (100.5 FM) that allowed both stations to increase their power without subjecting one or the other to co-channel interference. WNUF received permission to increase its power from 10,000 to 20,000 watts.

WNUF's studios and offices were co-located with a weekly buy-sell-trade publication called The Green Sheet, both of which were owned by Hammond. Since the building for the publication was owned by Hammond, the station was located there during the period he owned it. The station became known for its Big Band music format. While WNUF broadcast in stereo, since much of the Big Band music it played was recorded before the advent of stereo, many of the recordings were actually a form of "simulated" stereo or electronically re-recorded to simulate stereo. Though licensed to a suburb almost 20 miles from Pittsburgh, WNUF identified itself as a "North Hills" station. DJs were instructed to identify the station as "WNUF (speak softly and mumble) licensed to New Kensington (say clearly and loudly) North Hills".

In 1979, WNUF was granted an increase from 20,000 to 50,000 watts effective radiated power. The station still operated at 20,000 watts but moved to a different tower just outside Millvale, which allowed its antenna to broadcast from a much greater height. However, reception still proved to be a problem in Pittsburgh's South Hills and parts of the city.

Tal Weimer, Bill Trushel, Darrel Deiter, Dino Orsatti, Rich Beno, Fred Moulton, Craig Perry, Ron Miskoff, Larry Kemp and Christian Muro were among the announcers during the days when Hammond owned the station.

=== As WWCL ===
In March 1985, following the sale of WNUF by Hammond to Empire Media on Jan. 3 of that year, the station flipped to soft rock as WWCL, taking the moniker "Classy 101", advertising itself heavily with a series of TV commercials inviting potential listeners to call or write with feedback to improve the station, "because you're building Classy 101!" The attempt failed to make any kind of ratings success, largely due to its signal that limited it to listenership in Pittsburgh's North Hills and eastern suburbs, with listeners south of the city of Pittsburgh unable to hear it. The station also faced heavy competition from established soft rocker 3WS and from longtime easy-listening WPNT, which had operated for years as KDKA-FM. The latter station also switched to soft rock that same year and embarked on a heavy advertising campaign that proved to be highly successful.

=== As WXXP ===
After a year as WWCL, the station flipped formats in 1986 to alternative rock as WXXP ("Double X 100.7"). The station also moved to 224 North Avenue in Millvale, a few blocks from the Hammond building. This was Pittsburgh's first commercial alternative station. While the station did improve somewhat, it did not prosper. However, after its 1988 sale and subsequent format switch, its success under alternative rock inspired an AM station, WXVX, to assume the format.

=== As WMXP ===
On August 1, 1988, the station was acquired by Pittsburgh Partners (dba Signature Broadcasting). On August 22, the format flipped to hot adult contemporary, and assumed the call letters WMXP, with the slogan "Mix 100.7". Waylon Richards served as the station's new program director.

However, with the flip of crosstown competitor WSHH to soft adult contemporary also that year, "Mix 100.7" found it difficult to compete with three other adult contemporary stations, and was still plagued by signal limitations. After short-lived but successful Top 40 station WNRJ was sold and switched to an easy-listening format, WMXP took advantage of the opportunity and made the switch to Rhythmic top 40, taking on the identity of "Mix Jamz" in late 1990. Rich Hawkins then assumed duties of program director.

The following year, WMXP moved its transmitting antenna from Millvale to a nearby television broadcast tower owned by WPGH-TV. This allowed listeners in Pittsburgh's South Hills suburbs to hear the station for the very first time, and allowed full signal penetration within Pittsburgh's city limits.

=== As WQKB ===
While the format switch was successful, it would last until Midnight on January 1, 1993, when, after playing "End of the Road" by Boyz II Men, the station began stunting with all-Garth Brooks music as "K-Garth". On January 6, WMXP flipped to country as "K-Bear 100.7" (the WQKB calls were adopted on March 3, 1993). The switch came following the sale of the station to EZ Communications (owner of direct competitor B94) from Signature Broadcasting. Announcers Bill Webster and Jay Silvers under the "Mix Jamz" banner were retained under the new format.

=== As WZPT ===
On October 7, 1994, the station flipped to all-1970s' hits as "The Point 100.7", along with a change to new WZPT call letters. The station added '80s' music to its playlist in March 1997 (with the new slogan of "The Hits of the '70s and '80s). By October 1999, WZPT would drop the '70s' music, and added '90s' music to its playlist, with a shift to Hot AC, while still being branded as "The Point". At 6 p.m. on June 3, 2000, WZPT was rebranded as "Star 100.7".

"Star 100.7" logo used from 2006 to 2011

During its tenure as a Hot AC, the station called itself "Pittsburgh's Best Variety of the '80s, '90s and Today." One of their more popular music features was "Flashback Friday," consisting of mostly '80s and some '90s music.

Despite airing more of a mix of current music with '80s and '90s, WZPT's format was similar to that of sister station WBZZ ("B94"). In fact, after that station initially dropped the Top 40 format for active rock in 2004, listeners who liked B94 but didn't care for the new rock format were encouraged on-air to listen to WZPT.

=== As WBZZ ===
On January 19, 2010, B94 (93.7 FM) changed again, this time to sports talk as KDKA-FM ("93.7 The Fan"). CBS Radio also announced that they would merge Star with B94 to bring B94's music and some on-air personalities onto Star for listeners to continue to enjoy. In doing so, WZPT eliminated the 1980s, 1990s and 2000s tracks in favor of Adult Top 40 music, playing current and recent current music only. Star added more rhythmic artists such as Lady Gaga, Kesha, and Timbaland in addition to artists such as Shinedown, Kelly Clarkson and John Mayer.

On January 5, 2011, CBS Radio reacquired the WBZZ calls from the former WQSH-Albany, New York, with plans to use the calls to replace the WZPT calls. The call letter change was approved on January 19, 2011.

In October 2011, the words in the branding were swapped to "100.7 Star." The station also introduced a new logo.

On February 2, 2017, CBS Radio announced it would merge with Entercom. The merger was approved on November 9, 2017, and was consummated on the 17th.

By 2022, WBZZ tweaked its format to adult CHR, while also adding more rhythmic songs from the 1990s and 2000s. This resulted in Mediabase moving the station to its Top 40 panel. This move was reverted in 2026, with the station shifting back to a more conventional Hot AC format, branded as “90’s to Now”.

== HD Radio ==
WBZZ-HD2 logo as "B94 Replay"

100.7 began HD Radio operations in 2006. 100.7 HD-1 carried the standard analog format, while 100.7 HD2 carried a 1980s/1990s hits format dubbed the "80s/90s Flashback Channel" (named after their popular "Flashback Friday" program at the time). When the station rebranded as "100.7 Star" in October 2011, the HD2 channel shifted its format to include 2000s hits, and was renamed "Replay Radio", which includes heavy references to former sister station B94. WBZZ added an HD3 channel in August 2012, carrying CBS Radio's alternative-talk format, branded as "The Sky." The Sky was also carried on Seattle's KMPS-HD3 and Boston's WBMX-HD4. In early 2014, the HD3 channel flipped to Top 40/CHR, branded as "AMP Radio". As of July 25, 2018, WBZZ-HD3 changed to a simulcast of WAMO (AM), which aired a rhythmic contemporary format. On June 25, 2019, WAMO (AM) flipped to Urban AC as "107.3 The Beat", with the rhythmic format remaining on WBZZ-HD3 and FM translator 100.1 W261AX after that translator was repurposed to simulcast KDKA (AM) in November 2020, the rhythmic format would move to translator 107.3 W297BU and WAMO (AM); the simulcast remained on WBZZ-HD3 until early 2022, when it assumed Audacy's LGBTQ-centric talk and EDM format Channel Q.
