= Honsberger =

Honsberger is a surname. Notable people with the surname include:

- Fred Honsberger (1951–2009), American radio personality
- Ross Honsberger (1929–2016), Canadian mathematician
