= KDKA-FM =

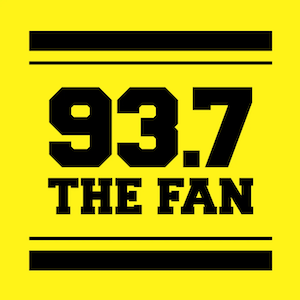

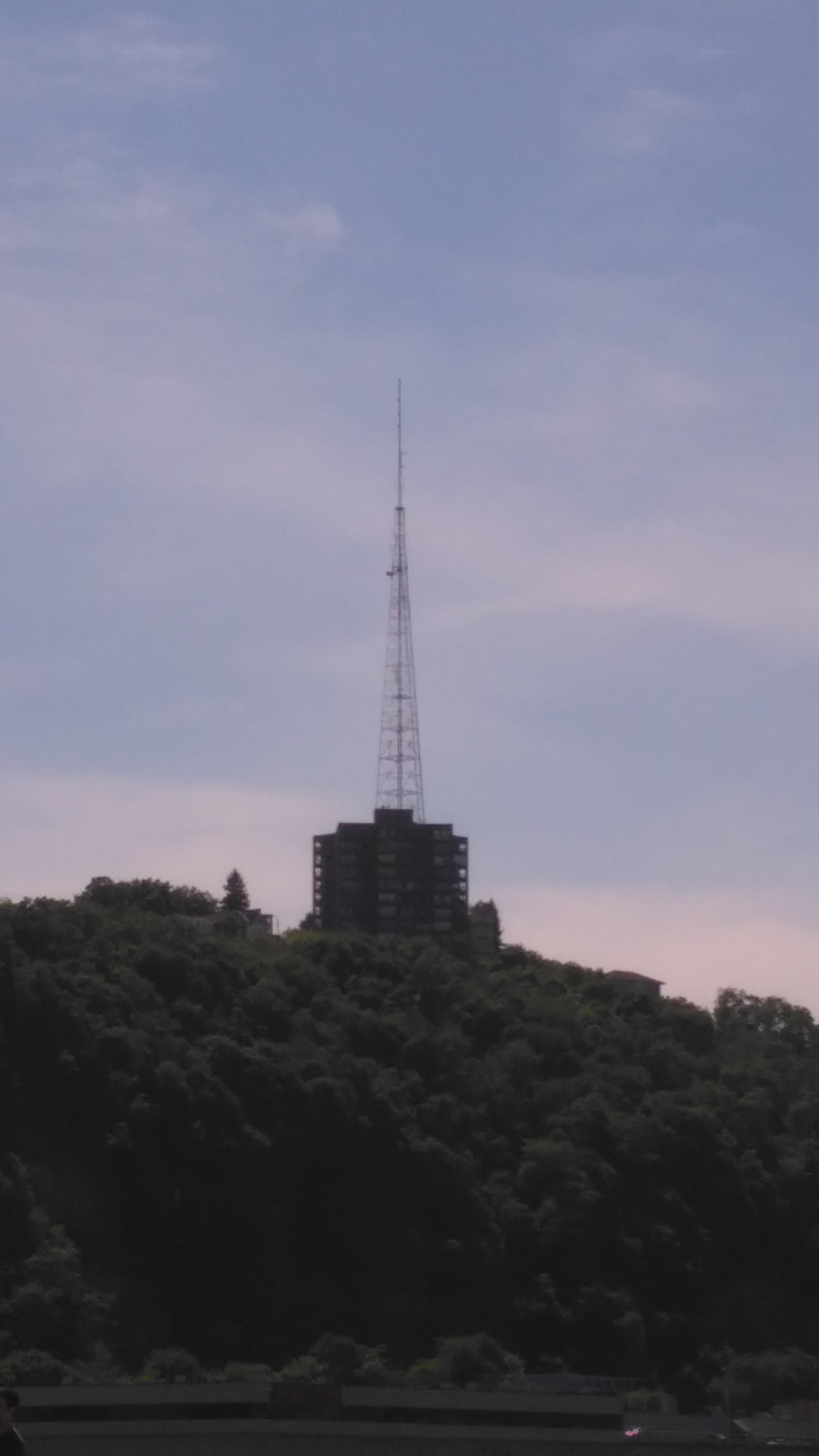
- KDKA-FM's broadcast tower atop Mount Washington
- Pittsburgh, Pennsylvania; United States
- Broadcast area: Pittsburgh metropolitan area
- Frequency: 93.7 MHz (HD Radio)
- Branding: 93.7 The Fan

Programming
- Language: English
- Format: Sports radio
- Subchannels: HD2: News/talk (KDKA); HD3: Westwood One Sports
- Affiliations: Westwood One Sports; Pittsburgh Pirates Radio Network; University of Pittsburgh Panthers Radio Network; NFL on Westwood One

Ownership
- Owner: Audacy, Inc.; (Audacy License, LLC)
- Sister stations: KDKA; WAMO; WBZZ (HD2); WDSY-FM

History
- First air date: 1948
- Former call signs: WKJF-FM (1948–1973); WKOI (1973–1974); WJOI (1974–1981); WBZZ (1981–2004); WRKZ (2004–2007); WTZN-FM (2007); WBZW-FM (2007–2010)
- Call sign meaning: taken from sister station KDKA

Technical information
- Licensing authority: FCC
- Facility ID: 20350
- Class: B
- ERP: 41,000 watts (analog); 1,955 watts (digital)
- HAAT: 167 meters (548 ft)
- Transmitter coordinates: 40°26′28.2″N 80°1′31.2″W
- Translator: HD2: 100.1 W261AX (Pittsburgh)

Links
- Public license information: Public file; LMS
- Webcast: Listen live (via Audacy)
- Website: www.audacy.com/937thefan

KDKA-FM (93.7 MHz, "93-7 The Fan") is a commercial FM radio station licensed to serve Pittsburgh, Pennsylvania. The station is owned by Audacy, Inc. through licensee Audacy License, LLC and broadcasts a sports radio format. Studios are located at Foster Plaza near Green Tree (west of Pittsburgh) while the broadcast tower used by the station is located near Mount Washington, next to its former studios in Pittsburgh's South Shore neighborhood at (40°26′28.2″N 80°1′31.2″W).

KDKA-FM serves as the flagship station for the Pittsburgh Pirates Radio Network and the University of Pittsburgh Panthers IMG radio network. It broadcasts in the HD Radio format and simulcasts the news/talk programming of co-owned KDKA (1020 AM) on its HD2 subchannel, while the national network feed of Westwood One Sports is heard on its HD3 subchannel.

KDKA-FM also carries Westwood One Sports programming late nights and on weekends.

== History ==
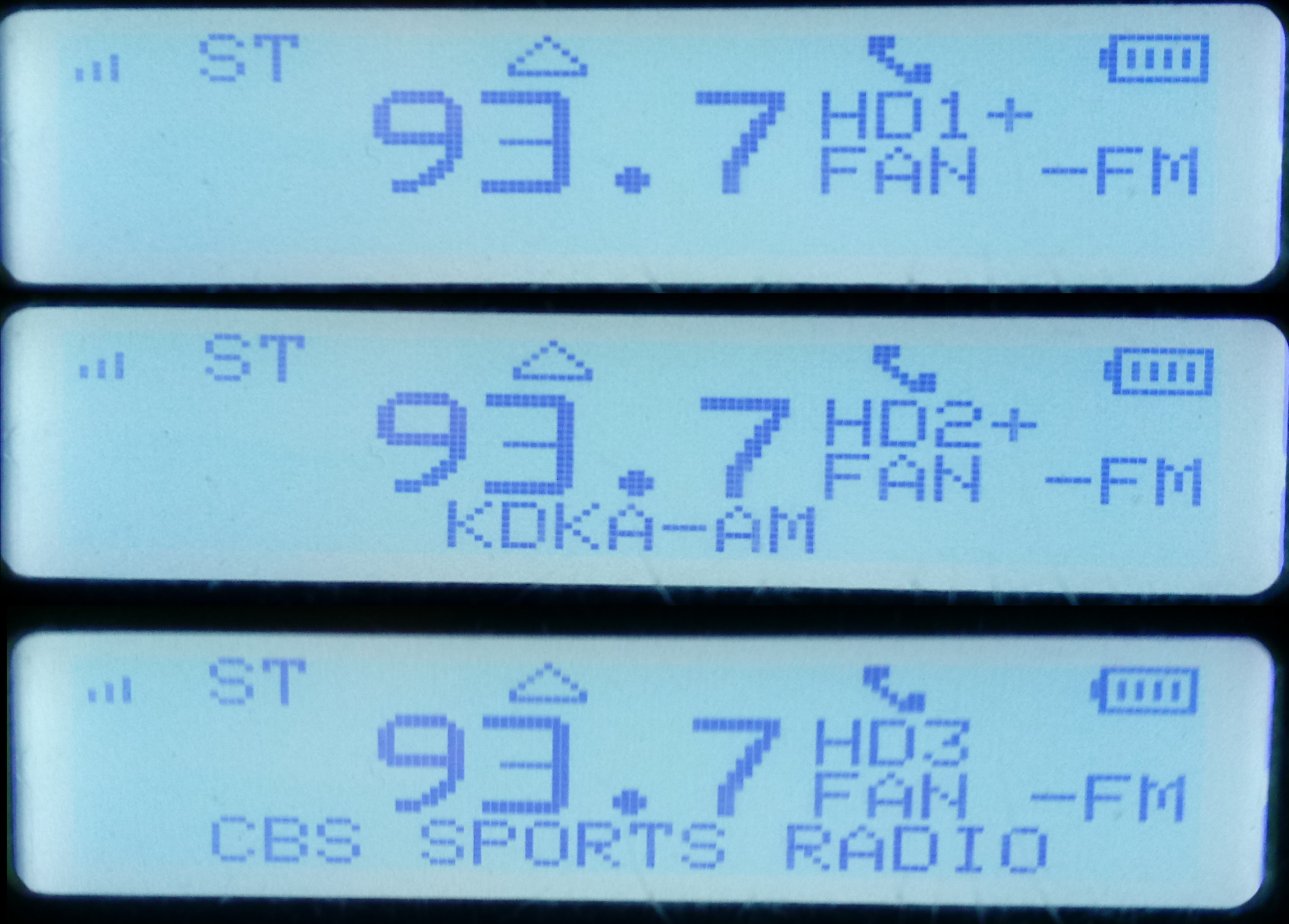
KDKA-FM's HD Radio Channels on a SPARC Radio with PSD and EAS.

=== Early years ===
In 1948, the station signed on for the first time as WKJF-FM. In the earliest days of FM radio, while most were co-owned with an AM station, WKJF was an independently owned FM station. For a brief time, there was a co-owned UHF TV station, WKJF-TV (now WPGH-TV), which operated from 1953 to 1954. WKJF changed its call sign to WKOI in 1973, and then to WJOI (standing for "Joy") in 1974. Through the 1960s and 1970s, the station programmed a beautiful music format. During the 1960s, Bill Hillgrove, who would later become a Pittsburgh sportscaster, was a staff member and hosted a Saturday night big band show titled "Stereo Dance Party".

In 1978, WJOI was acquired by EZ Communications, which primarily owned easy listening stations across the country. By the early 1980s, EZ Communications observed that the easy format was attracting an increasing number of older listeners, that were not sought after by most advertisers, and began to switch its stations to formats that would attract younger audiences.

=== WBZZ "B94" ===
At midnight on April 5, 1981, WJOI became WBZZ, and was rebranded as "B94". The first song played after the format switch was "It's Still Rock and Roll to Me" by Billy Joel. B94 became Pittsburgh's number one Top 40/CHR station, tailoring its programming to not only a younger audience, but also a Pittsburgh audience, and quickly overtook its competitors, including WXKX and WPEZ. B94 was also an affiliate of The Rockin' America Top 30 Countdown with Scott Shannon throughout the 1980s, as well as Open House Party with John Garabedian during the 1990s.

B94 featured local morning shows such as "Quinn and Banana" (hosted by Jim Quinn and "Banana" Don Jefferson) from its debut in 1983 until 1993, "John and Banana" with John Cline from 1993 until 1995, and "JohnDaveBubbaShelley" (hosted by Cline, Dave Kaelin, Marc "Bubba" Snider and Shelley Duffy, along with some minor personality changes) from 1995 through 2004. In addition, the station featured a mostly local air staff who were born and/or raised in the area.

EZ Communications merged with American Radio Systems in July 1997, with ARS merging with Infinity Broadcasting (owned by CBS Radio) in September of that year. (Infinity was renamed CBS Radio in December 2005.) In 1998, the station relocated from its longtime studios on Mount Washington to Foster Plaza in Green Tree.

In 2000, Clear Channel Communications unveiled a new Top 40 format on WKST-FM (the former WXKX), calling itself "KISS-FM", and began to take a large chunk out of B94's audience. With more syndicated programming featuring national air talent and focusing more on the younger audience, B94, for the first time, saw itself slipping into second place. Also not helping matters was sister station WZPT switching to a Hot AC format at the same time, which, while it played a mix of 1980s and 1990s music with current hits, otherwise had a similar format to B94.

On February 10, 2003, WBZZ rebranded as "93.7 BZZ". This was done as the station did not want any confusion of exactly where it was on the radio dial, especially considering that the only station in Pittsburgh actually on the 94 range (WWSW-FM) had an oldies format. It was also done to re-image the station to compete with WKST, and because most radio stations sound out their exact frequency rather than rounding it due to the spread of digital tuners. Later, in early 2004, the station tweaked its name again, calling itself "B93.7".

=== The "K-Rock" years and "The Zone" experiment ===
In 2004, Clear Channel Communications dropped The Howard Stern Show on its longtime Pittsburgh outlet WXDX-FM. In response, WBZZ operations manager Keith Clark decided to flip the station's format after 23 years, and not only wanted to pick up Stern to improve ratings, but also unveil a new active rock format known as "93.7 K-Rock" to compete with Clear Channel's other Pittsburgh rock stations.

At 8 am on June 30, 2004, after briefly touting a major announcement, WBZZ's on-air talent gathered to say goodbye to Pittsburgh, thanking the city for its support throughout the years. WBZZ ended the Top 40 format at 8:30 am that day with "Move This" by Technotronic, while the first song on "K-Rock" was "For Those About To Rock" by AC/DC. Listeners who were fans of WBZZ but did not like the new rock format were encouraged to listen to sister station WZPT. The WBZZ call sign was replaced by WRKZ on July 7, 2004. Ratings for the station improved initially after the switch, but began to decline before Howard Stern's departure for Sirius Satellite Radio.

Once Stern left, the station carried the syndicated David Lee Roth morning show; however, due to low ratings, Roth was replaced by the syndicated Opie and Anthony show less than three months after Roth's debut. The Kidd Chris afternoon drive time show, from co-owned WYSP in Philadelphia, aired on 93.7 from August 28, 2006, until March 19, 2007.

On April 2, 2007, WRKZ became "93.7 The Zone", and changed its call letters to WTZN-FM. This left Pittsburgh without an active rock station until WKVE in nearby Mount Pleasant flipped to active rock in 2009. WTZN-FM, although not carrying the "Free FM" name in its branding, was considered to be part of CBS's hot talk network by that name, which also included CBS FM stations in New York City, Los Angeles and other markets. Joining the lineup were Opie and Anthony, Pittsburgh native Dennis Miller, and former WDVE personality Scott Paulsen. The station also carried programming from Sporting News Radio (now SB Nation Radio). Miller and Paulsen were moved to 1020 KDKA when the hot talk format was abandoned.

=== Revival of B94 ===
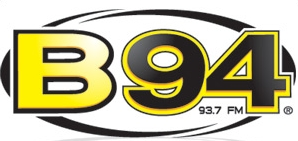
logo as B-94

At 10 am on October 1, 2007, after the Opie and Anthony Show ended, WTZN began stunting with Christmas music, in anticipation of a format flip scheduled for later that week. The station made some fairly obvious hints as to the future of the station, advertising "Something's missing in 'Pitts-urgh'", and asking, "What is missing in Pitts-urgh?" Listeners were prompted to go to www.pitts-urgh.com, where there was a message board asking "What do you miss the most about Pittsburgh?" Among the choices was "B94 Radio".

B94 returned to Pittsburgh the following Friday, October 5, at 5 pm, with its first song being Justin Timberlake's "SexyBack". CBS would later launch the Top 40/CHR format in Houston, San Francisco, New York City, Los Angeles, Detroit, Boston, Orlando and Philadelphia before 2017. The return of B94 was part of a CBS Radio initiative of resurrecting radio stations that had been killed off for other formats, such as WCBS-FM in New York and KFRC-FM in San Francisco. However, unlike those stations, which aired oldies/classic hits formats, B94 played current hits.

On November 27, 2007, WTZN switched its call sign to WBZW-FM to reflect its new format. B94's former call sign, WBZZ, had been taken by an Adult Contemporary radio station in Malta, New York. (That station is now WQBK-FM.) CBS Radio later reacquired the call sign for use on WZPT in 2011.

=== Sportsradio 93.7 The Fan ===
On January 19, 2010, CBS Radio announced it would drop the B94 branding and Top 40/CHR format again, and would flip the format to sports talk, launching February 15 under the name "Sportsradio 93.7 The Fan". The change was part of an initiative by CBS to establish FM sports talk stations across the country. The new sports station would compete with existing sports outlets ESPN Radio's WEAE and Fox Sports Radio affiliate WBGG.

With this announcement, several of B94's DJs were relocated to sister station WZPT, "Star 100.7". Bubba and Melanie Taylor from the former B94 morning show shifted to WZPT, with Bubba joining J.R. Randall and Shelley Duffy on the "Star" morning show, and Melanie taking the midday shift. Mixshow coordinator and weekend host 'TJ the DJ' moved to weekends to develop 'The Party To Go' weekend mix show. Former WZPT midday DJ Scott Alexander moved to afternoons on "Star", prompting the exit of former "Star" afternoon personality Jonny Hartwell. Kobe, B94's afternoon jock and Music Director, and Flick, B94's night jock, were both released. (Flick eventually was rehired by CBS to host nights on "Star".) Midday guy Sean "Coop" Cooper was transferred to nights at CBS-owned WYCD in Detroit.

On February 14, 93.7 began stunting with music played at sports events, also known as "Jock Jams", with B94 listeners being redirected to WZPT. The flip officially occurred at 6 am on February 15. Several station liners were also used (with a different branding) on sister stations WSCR in Chicago, WKRK-FM in Cleveland, and WFAN/WFAN-FM in New York.

The station adopted the KDKA-FM call sign on February 15, 2010. Many new CBS FM Sports stations took the same call letters as co-owned heritage AM or TV stations in their markets, including Boston's WBZ-FM, Philadelphia's WIP-FM, Baltimore's WJZ-FM, and Dallas' KRLD-FM. In this case, KDKA-FM took the call letters used by historic KDKA Radio since 1920. Even though the Federal Communications Commission does not usually grant call signs beginning with a "K" in the East, since those same call letters are on an existing grandfathered co-owned station, the KDKA-FM call sign was approved. (There had been a previous KDKA-FM in Pittsburgh owned by Westinghouse Broadcasting, which broadcast from the 1950s until 1979, mostly simulcasting KDKA at 92.9 MHz. Currently, it is separately owned WLTJ.)

In 2012, KDKA-FM became the flagship station for the Pittsburgh Pirates Radio Network and the University of Pittsburgh Panthers IMG College Sports Network. KDKA-FM took over Pirates broadcasts from previous flagship WPGB. If Pitt and the Pirates are on at the same time, KDKA-FM airs the Panthers and KDKA carries the Pirates.

On February 2, 2017, CBS Radio agreed to merge with Entercom, becoming a separate, publicly traded company under the Entercom name. The merger was approved on November 9, 2017, and was completed on November 17.

In October 2025, the station was awarded a Marconi Award by the National Association of Broadcasters in the "Best Large Market Station" category.
