= WDSY-FM =

- Pittsburgh, Pennsylvania; United States
- Broadcast area: Pittsburgh metropolitan area
- Frequency: 107.9 MHz (HD Radio)
- Branding: Y108

Programming
- Language: English
- Format: Country music
- Subchannels: HD2: Urban contemporary (WAMO); HD3: Sports gambling "The Bet"

Ownership
- Owner: Audacy, Inc.; (Audacy License, LLC)
- Sister stations: KDKA; KDKA-FM; WAMO; WBZZ (HD2)

History
- First air date: August 6, 1962; 63 years ago
- Former call signs: WYRE-FM (1962–1963); WEEP-FM (1963–1977)
- Call sign meaning: "Daisy" (former on-air moniker)

Technical information
- Licensing authority: FCC
- Facility ID: 18525
- Class: B
- ERP: 17,500 watts
- HAAT: 252 meters (827 ft)
- Transmitter coordinates: 40.4723°N 79.9945°W

Links
- Public license information: Public file; LMS
- Webcast: Listen live (via Audacy); Listen live (via Audacy) (HD3)
- Website: www.audacy.com/y108

WDSY-FM (107.9 MHz, "Y108") is a commercial radio station in Pittsburgh, Pennsylvania. It is owned by Audacy, Inc. and airs a country music radio format. The station's studios and offices are in Foster Plaza on Holiday Drive in Green Tree, Pennsylvania.

WDSY-FM has an effective radiated power (ERP) of 17,500 watts, its transmitter is located off Shreve Street in Pittsburgh's Spring Hill district. WDSY-FM broadcasts in the HD Radio hybrid format.

== History ==
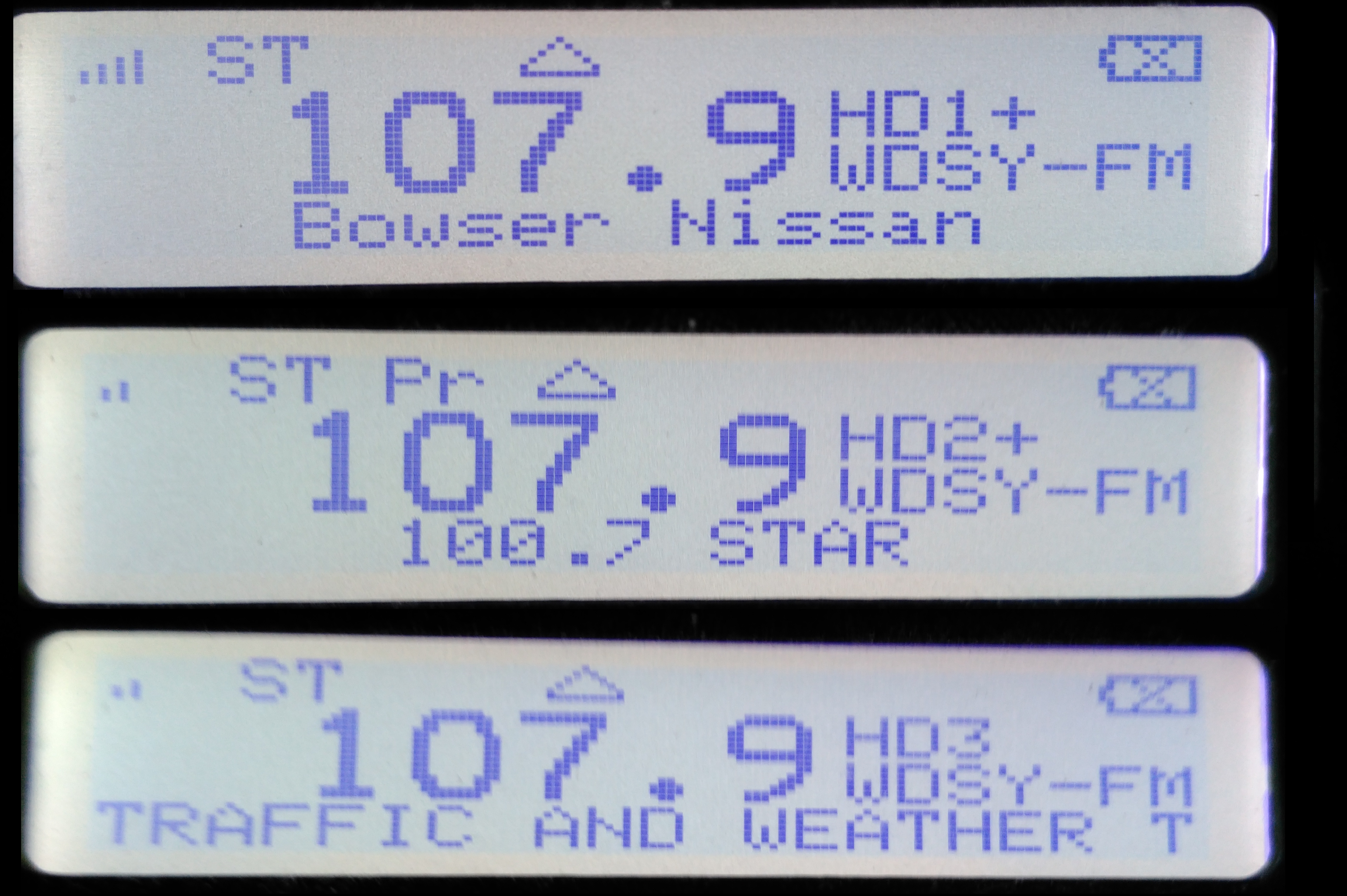
WDSY's HD Radio Channels on a SPARC Radio with PSD and EAS.

On August 6, 1962, WYRE-FM first signed on, co-owned with WYRE (1080 AM, now WWNL). Originally as a fully simulcast outlet of its AM sister station, it was owned by Golden Triangle Broadcasting and carried a country music format. WYRE (AM) was a daytimer station, while WYRE-FM operated primarily as a vehicle to serve listeners after the AM station was mandated to shut down after sunset. The following year, both stations switched their call signs to WEEP and WEEP-FM.

In the late 1960s, the Federal Communications Commission ordered FM stations to air separate programming from their AM counterparts most of the day. WEEP-FM broke away from its AM sister during the required hours, airing a softer vocal-based country music format, while its AM sister played more contemporary country hits. In 1977, WEEP-FM changed its call letters to WDSY-FM, and adopting the moniker "We're fresh as a Daisy!...The all new WDSY FM 108."

As more listeners began tuning to FM stations for music, WDSY-FM took on more of a flagship approach between the two stations, with WEEP simulcasting it, rather than the other way around. WDSY-FM evolved into a contemporary country station, and eventually was recognized as the exclusive country music outlet serving the Pittsburgh area. The station's ratings flourished in the late 1980s with the addition of two on-air personalities from top album rock station WDVE joining the WDSY-FM lineup: morning DJ Jimmy Roach and midday personality Chris DeCarlo. Ron Antill, Rock Thompson and Dyan Sheridyn rounded out the full time air staff.

In 1991, then-owner Entercom decided to change the station's branding and the station became known as "Pittsburgh's Country, Y108," though the music and call letters remained the same. Channel mentions of 107.9 FM later were incorporated into the branding as more radios came equipped with digital tuners.

In 1993, WDSY-FM moved from its longtime home in the Fulton Theatre (now known as the Byham Theater) building in downtown Pittsburgh to Gateway Towers, occupying space formerly used by WPIT, which had moved to Green Tree.

The station was acquired by CBS Radio in 1998. WDSY-FM then moved to studios and offices in Foster Plaza in Green Tree, about three miles southwest of downtown Pittsburgh.

The station's ratings flourished under CBS ownership, thanks in large part to a strong lineup of veteran air personalities, including Brian "Monty" Montgomery, Rick "Zeke" Eberhart, Ally Butler, Chris DeCarlo, Stoney Richards, and later the return of Jimmy Roach following a stint at crosstown competitor WOGI.

In the mid-2010s, the station began experimenting with different playlist tweaks. In response to the launch of iHeartMedia's Big 104.7 (WPGB), the station dropped most gold titles from the 1990s and 2000s in favor of more current material. In early 2017, select classic rock titles were added to the station's gold library, focusing on heartland and southern rock from artists such as Lynyrd Skynyrd, Bob Seger, The Georgia Satellites, and The Eagles. Both changes only lasted a matter of months.

On February 2, 2017, CBS Radio announced it would merge with Entercom, bringing WDSY-FM back to its former owners for the first time in nearly 20 years. The merger was approved on November 9, 2017, and was consummated on November 17. Shortly after the Entercom merger, the station's playlist tightened significantly and moved in a Top 40 direction both stylistically and musically, incorporating additional titles from the contemporary hit radio and adult contemporary formats not typically heard on country radio. The station reverted to a more mainstream country playlist in late 2022.

== WDSY-FM-HD2 ==
WDSY-FM-HD2 initially aired a classic country format, branded as "The Wolf." This lasted until June 2017, when it switched to a rebroadcast of sister station WBZZ, airing a Hot Adult Contemporary format.

== WDSY-FM-HD3 ==
WDSY-FM HD3 initially aired a format of all-new country songs, branded as "The Bull." On July 19, 2017, WDSY-FM-HD3 flipped to a 24/7 traffic and weather format powered by co-owned KDKA called "KDKA Traffic and Weather Together." Reports aired every 3 minutes and was live weekdays from 5 a.m.-7 p.m., with road closures, construction reports and freshly updated weather forecasts inserted regularly at all other times.

In August 2019, WDSY-FM-HD3 flipped to "Channel Q," Entercom's Talk/EDM service for the LGBTQ community.

On February 23, 2022, WDSY-FM-HD3 flipped to "The Bet", Audacy's sports gambling network. Channel Q would be moved to WBZZ-HD3.
