= KDKA (AM) =

Talk radio station in the Pittsburgh, Pennsylvania

- Pittsburgh, Pennsylvania; United States
- Broadcast area: Western Pennsylvania
- Frequency: 1020 kHz
- Branding: 100.1 FM and AM 1020 KDKA

Programming
- Format: Talk radio
- Affiliations: ABC News Radio; KDKA-TV; Westwood One; NFL on Westwood One; Pittsburgh Pirates Radio Network

Ownership
- Owner: Audacy, Inc.; (Audacy License, LLC)
- Sister stations: KDKA-FM; WAMO; WBZZ; WDSY-FM

History
- First air date: November 2, 1920 (as 8ZZ)

Technical information
- Licensing authority: FCC
- Facility ID: 25443
- Class: A
- Power: 50,000 watts unlimited
- Transmitter coordinates: 40°33′33.25″N 79°57′10.2″W (main); 40°33′39″N 79°57′20″W (aux)
- Translator: 100.1 W261AX (Pittsburgh)
- Repeater: 93.7 KDKA-FM HD2 (Pittsburgh)

Links
- Public license information: Public file; LMS
- Webcast: Listen live (via Audacy)
- Website: www.audacy.com/kdkaradio

KDKA (1020 kHz) is a class A, clear channel, AM radio station, licensed to Pittsburgh, Pennsylvania. Owned and operated by Audacy, Inc. and the market affiliate for ABC News Radio, Its radio studios are located at the combined Audacy Pittsburgh facility in the Foster Plaza on Holiday Drive in Green Tree, and its transmitter site is at Allison Park. The station's programming is also carried over 93.7 KDKA-FM's HD2 digital subchannel, and is simulcast on FM translator W261AX at 100.1 MHz.

KDKA features a news/talk radio format. Operating with a transmitter power of 50,000 watts non-directional, the station can be heard during daylight hours throughout central and western Pennsylvania, along with portions of the adjacent states of Ohio, West Virginia, and Maryland. Under the right conditions, it can also be heard in far western New York State and the southernmost part of the Canadian province of Ontario. At night, KDKA can be heard across much of the Eastern United States and Eastern Canada with a good radio. The station serves as western Pennsylvania's Primary Entry Point for the Emergency Alert System.

KDKA has described itself as the "Pioneer Broadcasting Station of the World". It is considered by many historians as the first commercially licensed radio station. Initially using the temporarily assigned "special amateur" call sign of 8ZZ, it traces its beginning to its broadcast of the Harding-Cox presidential election results on the evening of November 2, 1920.

== History ==
=== Initial point-to-point service license ===
Although KDKA's history has been extensively reviewed, there are some inconsistencies between accounts, leading one researcher to note: "While the KDKA story is often recounted, the details tend to vary slightly both in the secondary source material and in the published recollections of the participants, including differences in the chronology of events and the relative importance of the parties involved."

KDKA's establishment was an outgrowth of the post-World War I efforts of the Westinghouse Electric and Manufacturing Company of East Pittsburgh, Pennsylvania, to expand its commercial operations in the radio industry. During the war, Westinghouse received government contracts to develop radio transmitters and receivers for military use. They used recently developed vacuum tube equipment that was capable of audio communication. Previous spark gap transmitters could only be used to transmit the dots-and-dashes of Morse code. At the time of the entry of the United States into World War I in April 1917, the government ordered all civilian radio stations off the air. However, during the conflict Westinghouse received permission to operate research radio transmitters located at its East Pittsburgh plant and at the home of one of its lead engineers, Frank Conrad, in nearby Wilkinsburg. (Note: Davis, H.P. (1928). "Davis (1928), page 191" – via archive.org.)

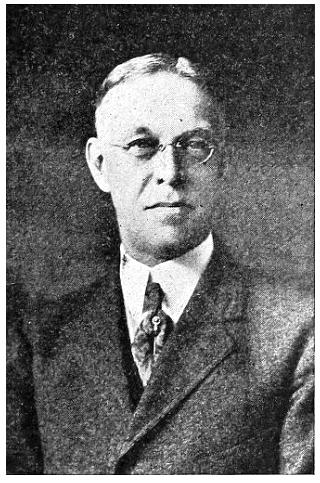
Harry P. Davis, Westinghouse vice president and founder of KDKA

With the end of the war, the government contracts were canceled. However, Westinghouse moved aggressively to establish itself as a national and international provider of radio communication. Its primary competitor in this effort was the Radio Corporation of America (RCA), which had recently been formed as a subsidiary by Westinghouse's arch rival, the General Electric Company of Schenectady, New York, using the assets of the Marconi Company of America.

The effort to establish Westinghouse's radio industry presence was led by company vice president H. P. Davis. To strengthen the company's patent position, especially related to receivers, he spearheaded the purchase of the International Radio Telegraph Company, primarily to gain control of a "heterodyne" patent originally issued to Reginald Fessenden, and also arranged for the purchase of the commercial rights to the regenerative and superheterodyne patents held by Edwin Howard Armstrong. However, because of the competitive advantage RCA had in international and marine communications, initially there appeared to be limited opportunities available to Westinghouse.

Although it would gain its fame as a broadcasting station, KDKA actually originated as part of a project to establish private radiotelegraph links between Westinghouse's East Pittsburgh factory and its other facilities, to avoid the business expense of paying for telegraph and telephone lines. In September 1920, a newspaper report noted that "a new high-power station, to operate under a special or commercial license, is being installed at the Westinghouse plant in East Pittsburgh. It will be used to establish communication between the East Pittsburgh plant and the company branch factories at Cleveland, O., Newark, N. J., and Springfield, Mass., where similar outfits will be employed."

KDKA's October 27, 1920 Limited Commercial license. The first four pages are the station's license, pages 5 and 6 are the station's Form 761 application, and page 7 is supplemental application information

An application, signed by H. P. Davis, was submitted to the Eighth District Radio Inspector, S. W. Edwards in Detroit, who forwarded it to Washington, and on October 27, 1920, Westinghouse was issued a Limited Commercial station license, serial No. 174, with the identifying call letters of KDKA. This Limited Commercial grant was consistent with the standard practice being followed at this time, for licenses issued to companies engaging in private radio communication. Neither KDKA's original application, nor the resulting license, mentioned broadcasting, only that the station was to be used for radiotelegraphic communication with stations located at the Westinghouse facilities in Cleveland, Newark and Springfield, plus station WCG in Brooklyn, New York, which was operated by the recently acquired International Radio Telegraph. (Note: The copy of the initial KDKA license on file at the National Archives has a handwritten notation "First broadcasting licensee" written across the front, but this appears to have been added at a later date.)

At this time, radio stations in the United States were regulated by the Department of Commerce's Bureau of Navigation. Beginning with the introduction of licensing in late 1912, the standard practice had been to assign call letters starting with "W" to radio stations in the eastern United States, with the Mississippi River set as the boundary in January, 1923. However, KDKA happened to receive its assignment during a short period during which land stations were being issued call letters from a sequential block of "K" call letters that had previously been assigned only to ship stations. Although the original policy was restored a few months later, KDKA was permitted to keep its non-standard call sign. (Note: The temporary switch to four-letter "K" call signs for new land station grants is documented by the monthly issues of the Commerce Department's Radio Service Bulletin. Through the June 1920 issue, non-government land station grants generally received three-letter K or W calls. But from the July 1920 through May 1921 issues, these stations now primarily received four-letter K calls, including KDKA, which appeared in the November 1920 issue. The June 1921 issue records a return to the original policy of primarily three-letter calls, with "K" in the west, and "W" in the east.)

=== Addition of a broadcasting service ===
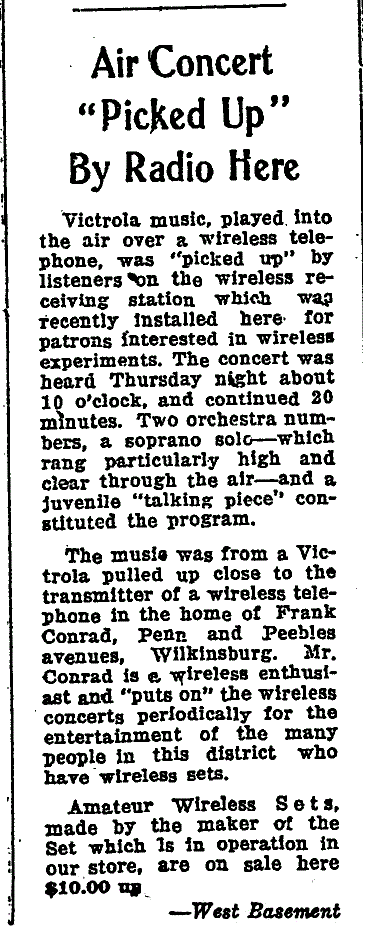
A September 1920 Horne's Department store advertisement led to the establishment, beginning with KDKA, of broadcasting stations by Westinghouse.

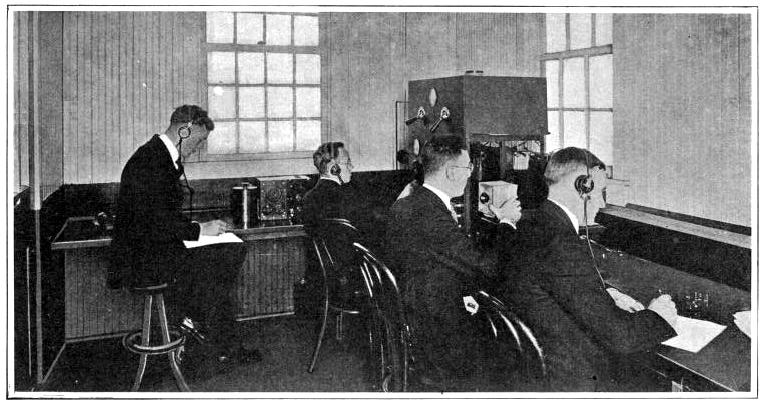
Photograph of the 9th floor KDKA transmission room. c. 1921

Shortly after beginning the process of setting up KDKA to be used for point-to-point communication, a series of events occurred which resulted in it also becoming a broadcasting station, which would overshadow its original role.

Prior to World War I, Frank Conrad had operated an experimental radiotelegraph station, with the callsign 8XK. (Note: The "8" in 8XK's call sign indicated that the station was in the 8th Radio Inspection district, while the "X" signified that it was operating under an experimental license.) Following the war, the U.S. government again allowed the operation of civilian radio stations, and Conrad revived 8XK, which was located in a detached two-story garage at his residence. He used the knowledge gained during the wartime period to upgrade his station to begin making audio transmissions, and became well known among radio amateurs for his experimental activities. On October 17, 1919, Conrad made the first of what would become a semi-regular series of entertainment broadcasts.

During this time the Joseph Horne department store ran daily full-page advertisements in the Pittsburgh papers, and, in its placement of September 23, 1920, stated that the store had started selling "Amateur Wireless Sets" for "$10 upwards". Six days later, the store's September 29 installment included a small notice titled "Air Concert 'Picked Up' By Radio Here", which noted that its demonstration set had been used to receive one of the Conrad broadcasts. H. P. Davis saw this advertisement and immediately recognized the "limitless opportunity" of adding radio receivers to the lines of appliances sold to the general public by Westinghouse, and to create demand for the receivers, he decided that Westinghouse should provide regular programming as an incentive for persons considering a purchase. Davis held a staff meeting with his "radio cabinet" and asked them to have a station operational in time to broadcast the presidential and local election returns on November 2, 1920.

Election return broadcasts had been a tradition since shortly after the development of radio, although due to technical limitations initially they could only be done using Morse code, which greatly limited the potential audiences. (Note: Examples of election results sent in Morse code for the 1912 U.S. Presidential election included "Local wireless men pick up much news". Pittsburgh Press. broadcast by the Tech Wireless Club station at Carnegie Technical School in Pittsburgh. November 6, 1912. p. 5. "Harvard wireless club gets returns". Boston Post. broadcast by the Charlestown, Massachusetts Navy Yard station. November 6, 1912. p. 3. "Election news is sent by wireless". Idaho Republican. broadcast by the Navy's Mare Island, California station. November 8, 1912. p. 1. and "Wireless gives island returns". San Francisco Call. broadcast by the Federal Telegraph station at San Francisco. November 6, 1912. p. 6..) Following the development of vacuum-tube transmitters that made audio transmissions via amplitude modulation (AM) possible, the first spoken-word election night broadcast was made on November 7, 1916 by the DeForest Radio Telephone and Telegraph Company's station, 2XG, located in the Highbridge section of New York City, in conjunction with the New York American, announcing the results of the Wilson-Hughes presidential election. On August 31, 1920, The Detroit News, whose "Detroit News Radiophone" began making daily broadcasts on August 20, had broadcast local primary election results. That station operated under the amateur call sign of "8MK" and is now AM 950 WWJ.

Westinghouse's preparations included the construction of a shack and antenna system on the roof of the nine-story K Building at the East Pittsburgh Works in Turtle Creek, Pennsylvania. The antenna consisted of six 90-foot-long (27 m) wires spread 20 feet (6 m) apart, strung 210 feet (64 m) above the ground between a brick smokestack and a 100-foot (30 m) pipe mast atop the K Building. Frank Conrad had originally planned to broadcast the election results over 8XK, in cooperation with the American Radio Relay League, but shifted his efforts to help with the Westinghouse broadcast. He and Donald G. Little had primary responsibility for constructing a 100 watt vacuum-tube transmitter, scaling up Conrad's previous 50 watt radiotelephone transmitter design.

A telephoned temporary authorization was received to operate under the call sign of 8ZZ. (The first "Z" in this call sign indicated it was a "Special Amateur" grant, which was a classification that permitted the use of transmitting frequencies other than the congested 200 meter (1500 kHz) standard amateur wavelength.) Although the pre-broadcast publicity and contemporary accounts stated that 8ZZ was the call sign used for the election night broadcast — for example, in 1922 L.R. Krumm, Westinghouse's Superintendent of Radio Operations, referred to Westinghouse's "station at East Pittsburgh, now known as KDKA, the matured successor of 8ZZ" (Note: Krumm (1922) additionally noted that "A special license was obtained from the government radio inspector in Detroit, Michigan, and the call letters 8ZZ were assigned to the station in the beginning." Other early sources documenting the use of the 8ZZ call sign for the election night broadcast include an article "KDKA". The Wireless Age. August 1922 – via babel.hathitrust.org., which recounts that "Those words brought the now famous KDKA station into being, but little was thought then that the transmission of presidential election returns from this station, which was then known as 8ZZ, would result in the widespread interest in radio that is now present throughout the country"; another article with the same title Little, D.G. (June 1924). "KDKA". Proceedings of the Institute of Radio Engineers: 255 – via babel.hathitrust.org., which states that "The temporary calls first assigned were 8ZZ", and finally Kintner, S.M. (December 1932). "Pittsburgh's contributions to radio". Proceedings of the Institute of Radio Engineers. reported: "Conrad stayed at his home, prepared to shift over to his station, in the event of the failure of the East Pittsburgh Station, then known as '8ZZ'." (Both Little and Kintner were engineers who helped set up the station for the election night broadcast.)) — later reviews, including a 1930 re-creation of the original broadcast, often incorrectly state that the KDKA call sign was used during the debut broadcast.

Extensive regional publicity by Westinghouse heralded the upcoming broadcast, both among technically knowledgeable amateur radio enthusiasts, plus, through the organization of public listening sites, toward a more general audience of potential future radio receiver purchasers. Promotional announcements described the offering as a joint effort between Westinghouse and its International Radio Telegraph subsidiary, and A. E. Braun, an International Radio Telegraph officer who was also the president of the Pittsburgh Post and Pittsburgh Sun, made the arrangements for his newspapers to provide election results to the station.

In the days before November 2, a series of test transmissions were made to check the equipment. The announcer for the election night broadcast was a publicity department staff member, Leo Rosenberg. Frank Conrad stood by at his home station, (Note: Contrary to some later accounts, Conrad's 8XK and Westinghouse's 8ZZ/KDKA were completely separate stations. Following KDKA's start Conrad made at least one more entertainment broadcast from his home over 8XK, on December 4, 1920 ("Wireless Concert", Monessen (Pennsylvania) Daily Independent, December 6, 1920, page 1), and continued to actively use the station for experimental work, until it was deleted on November 3, 1924.) ready to take over using his 8XK transmitter if the East Pittsburgh transmitter failed, but the effort was successful, with one newspaper report noting that: "The returns by wireless telephone, which were transmitted from the Westinghouse international radio station at East Pittsburgh, were exceptionally clear and distinct. The service was utilized by many amateurs to entertain gatherings at their various stations. Between announcements of the returns radiophone music was transmitted, which added much to the entertainment."

This Westinghouse broadcast was not unique – that evening at least three other stations made audio transmissions of election returns, including the Detroit News' "Detroit News Radiophone" service, a temporary arrangement made by the Saint Louis Post-Dispatch in conjunction with William E. Woods of the Benwoods Company, "manufacturers and distributors of wireless outfits", and the Buffalo Evening News, over an amateur station operated by Charles C. Klinck, Jr. Later station publicity proclaimed that Westinghouse's election night broadcast "was a national sensation, acclaimed by newspapers all over the country", however a comprehensive review of contemporary newspapers determined that reports, although positive, actually appeared only in a few local papers, thus it "was not an immediate 'sensation' and that the fame of this event developed over time with later celebratory accounts". Although the election night broadcast was only heard by about 1,000 people, KDKA would eventually gain national prominence once it began to offer an extensive range of programming.

After initially operating under the call sign 8ZZ – apparently for just a few days, although the chronology is not completely clear – the station switched to identifying itself as KDKA. Through the next month semiweekly broadcasts were made, until December 21, when the station embarked on an ambitious daily schedule, initially for about an hour each evening. (Reflecting the December launch, the January 1, 1922, debut issue of Westinghouse's Radio Broadcasting News included the reference "Fifty-fourth week broadcasting".) KDKA soon gained a reputation as one of the premier broadcasting stations in the nation. On August 1, 1921, the transmitter was upgraded from 100 to 500 watts, and two months later saw an additional doubling, to 1,000 watts.

The election night broadcast was transmitted on a wavelength of 550 meters (545 kHz). Later publicity stated that KDKA was now broadcasting on 330 meters (909 kHz), and in the fall of 1921 all the Westinghouse broadcasting stations began using 360 meters (833 kHz). In the United States there were no formal standards defining a broadcasting station until December 1, 1921, when the Department of Commerce issued a regulation specifying that stations making broadcasts intended for the general public now had to hold a Limited Commercial license that authorized operation on 360 meters or 485 meters (619 kHz). KDKA was one of a small number of stations that already met this standard at the time of its adoption, as its second year-long license, issued November 7, 1921, included the notation "360 meters for general broadcasting" in addition to continuing the point-to-point service authorization.

Encouraged by the success of KDKA, by the end of 1921 Westinghouse established stations in three additional major population centers, including WJZ in Newark, New Jersey (now WABC in New York City); WBZ, originally in Springfield, Massachusetts (now Boston); and KYW, originally in Chicago, Illinois (now Philadelphia).

=== 1920s ===
As a pioneer in radio broadcasting, KDKA struggled in particular with studio acoustics, especially for large groups of performers. An early attempt to broadcast a concert by Westinghouse employees from a local auditorium found that the sensitive microphones picked up echoes from the walls, causing severe distortion. Moving the performers outdoors eliminated the echoing, so a tent was erected on the building roof, and for a time concerts were performed from this location. Eventually the tent was blown down in a storm, so it was moved indoors, where it was found the tent material helped deaden the echoes. This led to modern studio design, including walls covered with noise-absorbing material, initially "monks cloth" (which turned out to be a fancy name for burlap). (Note: Davis, H.P. (1928). "Davis (1928) pages 199–201" – via archive.org.)

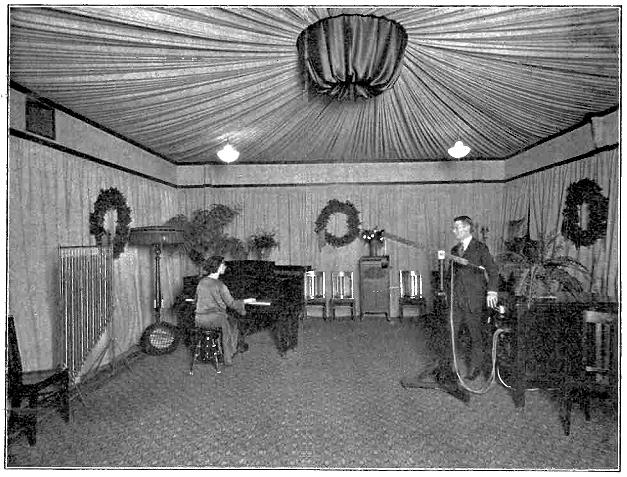
As part of ongoing facility upgrades, this well-appointed studio went into service on December 18, 1922.

Early programming often featured live musical performances by a band composed of Westinghouse employees. The station provided its first remote broadcast on January 2, 1921, airing a religious service from Calvary Episcopal Church. The Calvary services soon became a regular Sunday evening offering, and were continued until 1962. On January 15, 1921, at 8 p.m., KDKA broadcast a speech on European relief by Herbert Hoover from the Duquesne Club in Pittsburgh, that was carried ten miles (sixteen kilometers) by a telephone line connection to Westinghouse's East Pittsburgh Works. On July 2, 1921, RCA arranged to broadcast live, over temporary station WJY, the Jack Dempsey – Georges Carpentier heavyweight boxing match in New Jersey, with the company claiming that 300,000 persons listened to the WJY transmission. KDKA participated in the event by providing supplemental coverage west of WJY's range, as a KDKA announcer repeated the ringside commentary, after it had been relayed by telegraph by Westinghouse engineers who were listening to the WJY broadcast. KDKA's participation included six theaters where attendees were charged admission to hear the reports. On August 5, 1921, KDKA became the first radio station to broadcast a major league professional baseball game, when announcer Harold Arlin called the Pittsburgh Pirates-Philadelphia Phillies game from Forbes Field. In the fall of that year, the station became the first to broadcast a college football game. In 1922, KDKA hosted political humorist Will Rogers in his first radio appearance.

Initially KDKA had to share its 360-meter assignment with the other broadcasting stations that were established in the region, until May 15, 1923, when the Department of Commerce expanded the broadcasting frequency assignments into a band from 550 to 1350 kHz. Under this new plan 920 kHz was exclusively allocated to Pittsburgh, and KDKA was granted sole use of this frequency.

The original financing plan, of using the revenues from radio receiver sales to pay station costs, proved to be insufficient for a number of reasons. Additional expenses included the requirement to pay royalties to musical composers, plus the fact that, unlike the amateur Westinghouse Company staff performers, professional acts started to expect to be paid in something more tangible than publicity. On the revenue side, Westinghouse found that it didn't have the near-monopoly for selling vacuum-tube receivers that it expected it had gotten through the purchase of the commercial rights to the Armstrong regenerative patent. Armstrong had previously sold "amateur and experimental" rights to around 17 small firms, which also began selling receivers to the general public. Westinghouse sued on the grounds that this went beyond their rights, but lost, which resulted in the formation of a series of major competitors, including Crosley and Zenith.

Running over-the-air commercials was an obvious financing alternative, but initially Westinghouse officials were soundly against the idea, contending that it would destroy the listening experience. In 1922 J. C. McQuiston, from the Westinghouse Department of Publicity, declared that "if advertising were permitted, it goes without saying that all the good work that has been done in giving valuable information and pleasant entertainment for the people would be destroyed". In 1922, H. P. Davis suggested that the best solution was "five or six large, well-located and powerful stations" which "could be licensed, protected and organized... and that it would become a matter of such public value, that endowments or Federal subsidies would be possible which would assist those responsible for the service to carry it on and to continue the development and research required to get the most value out of it". However, in 1928 he stated that he had realized "from the beginning" that advertising would be the ultimate financing solution. (Note: Davis, H.P. (1928). "Davis (1928) p. 223" – via archive.org.)

Westinghouse, along with RCA and General Electric, was a co-founder in 1926 of the National Broadcasting Company (NBC), which created two national radio networks: the NBC Red Network and the NBC Blue Network. KDKA became affiliated with the Blue network, and with this change began selling airtime: up until now, the station had been commercial-free. KDKA played popular music and advertisers began sponsoring special radio programs like The Philco Hour, The Maxwell House Hour and The Wrigley Party.

A general frequency reassignment under the provisions of newly formed Federal Radio Commission's General Order 40, effective November 11, 1928, led to KDKA being assigned to the "clear channel" frequency of 980 kHz. On January 1, 1929, the station inaugurated new studio facilities located in the William Penn Hotel, and on June 26 relocated its Master Control facilities to the hotel.

=== 1930s and 1940s ===
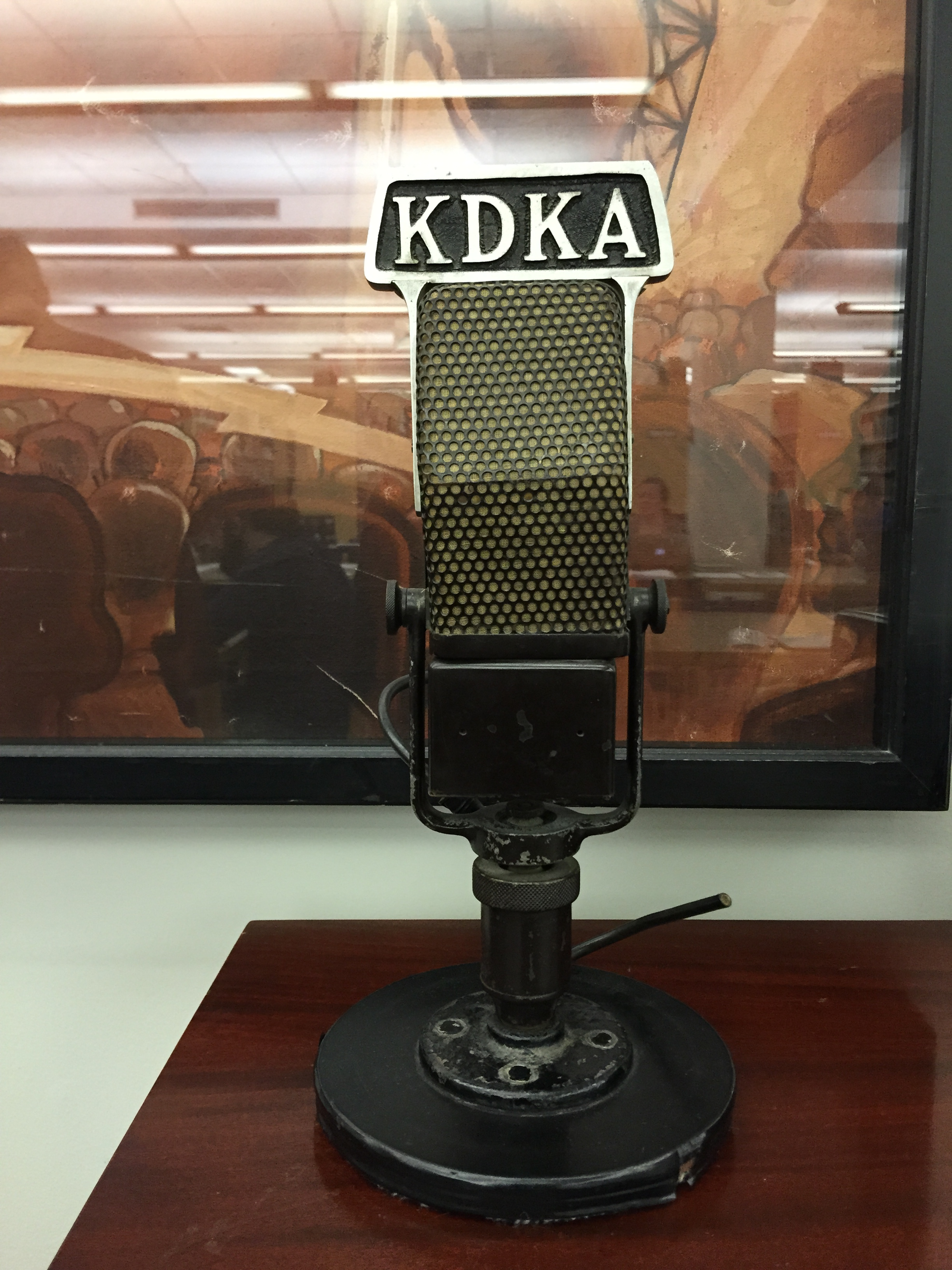
KDKA microphone

In 1932, as a result of antitrust proceedings, Westinghouse had to divest its 40% ownership stake of RCA and 20% ownership in NBC. At 10:45 p.m. on November 2, 1934, the station's 14th birthday, KDKA inaugurated new studios in the Grant Building. The William Penn Hotel studios later became the home of WCAE.

In the 1930s, KDKA began the long-running (1932–1980) Uncle Ed Shaughency show. The station played popular big band and jazz music every morning as well as hosting the KDKA Farm Hour. From 1941 to 1959, the Farm Hour was built around farm reports along with music by Slim Bryant and his Wildcats, who eventually became the top local country music act in the Pittsburgh area. Special programming included ongoing coverage of the 1936 St. Patrick's Day flood that submerged Downtown Pittsburgh as far as Wood Street. A final frequency change took place in March 1941, under the provisions of the North American Regional Broadcasting Agreement, as KDKA's clear channel assignment was shifted from 980 to 1020 kHz.

In 1943, NBC was compelled by the U.S. government to divest itself of one of its two networks, which resulted in it selling the Blue network (which became the American Broadcasting Company). Prior to the sale KDKA swapped affiliations with KQV to become affiliated with the NBC-Red network. Also during this period, in 1942 it gained a sister station, W75P, on the then-new FM band, which later became KDKA-FM, changing to WPNT in 1979. This station was sold by Westinghouse in 1984, and is now WLTJ.

In 1946, KDKA provided live coverage of the inauguration of David L. Lawrence as Pittsburgh Mayor, as well as the presidential and gubernatorial inaugurations. By the end of the decade, the musical and comedy team of Buzz Aston and Bill Hinds, billed as "Buzz & Bill", aired.

=== 1950s ===
In the 1950s, Ed Shaughency was moved from mornings to the afternoon, losing his partner, Rainbow (Elmer Walters) in the process. Impressed with the success Rege Cordic was having at WWSW, KDKA hired him away, and Cordic started his KDKA run on Labor Day, 1954. The Cordic & Company morning show, featuring a team of bright and innovative personalities, was a pioneer of today's "morning team" radio format, but in an unconventional way. Cordic and his group played a small amount of music, but primarily provided entertainment through skits, including recurring characters such as "Louie The Garbageman" and space alien "Omicron". Cordic's crew included Karl Hardman and Bob Trow, later known for portraying "Bob Dog" and "Robert Troll" on Mister Rogers' Neighborhood.

The 1950s saw a shift to more local programming, as the national radio shows were moving to television. Art Pallan, hired away from WWSW, and Bob Tracey became household names, playing the popular music of the day. For some years announcer Sterling Yates, also a musician, played hip, progressive jazz on a Sunday morning broadcast. On January 1, 1951, the married couple Ed and Wendy King launched Party Line, KDKA's first talk show, which ran until Ed King's death on November 18, 1971. Unlike most talk shows, callers were not heard, with the couple taking turns relaying the callers' information. In 1956 newsman Bill Steinbach began his 36-year career at the station – within 10 years he was the anchor of the award-winning 90-to-6 news program.

KDKA cautiously embraced rock and roll music, with artists such as Bill Haley, the Everly Brothers, Fats Domino, and Elvis Presley, in addition to popular vocalists including Frank Sinatra, Peggy Lee, and Canonsburg, Pennsylvania native Perry Como. However, the station's sound remained much more conservative than most Top 40 stations. In 1955, the station began regular broadcasts of Pittsburgh Pirates baseball games, a partnership that ended in 2006, but was restarted in 2012 when KDKA-FM began carrying the games.

KDKA gained a television sister station in late 1954, when Westinghouse purchased WDTV (channel 2) from the DuMont Television Network for a then-record price of $9.75 million. Before the purchase, Westinghouse had attempted to purchase the channel 13 license allocated for public broadcasting, but eventually donated the tower to public interest groups and gave financial backing for the eventual WQED. The television station was renamed KDKA-TV on January 31, 1955. KDKA-TV affiliated with CBS, in contrast to KDKA's longtime NBC affiliation. KDKA radio remained affiliated with NBC radio until the network purchased WJAS in 1957 for WJAS's owners to gain a 50% ownership stake in WIIC-TV (now WPXI) with the Pittsburgh Post-Gazette. KDKA then went independent, relying more on its Group W ties than on a national network.

On April 30, 1956, KDKA relocated its studios from the Grant Building to Gateway Center, joining KDKA-TV. Broadcasting-Telecasting described the new arrangement as "combined facilities" similar to what Westinghouse had established at its Boston stations, WBZ and WBZ-TV.

=== 1960s ===
By 1960, KDKA added more rock and roll music, as competitor KQV made ratings gains. "Your Pal" Pallan played hit songs and KDKA carried the sounds of screaming crowds as the Beatles arrived in Pittsburgh in 1964. The major exponent of rock on KDKA radio was disc jockey Clark Race, who also hosted "Dance Party" on KDKA-TV, a local version of Dick Clark's American Bandstand. Other artists featured on the station included the Four Seasons, the Vogues, Lou Christie (the latter two Pittsburgh-bred), the Beach Boys, the Hollies, the Supremes, Four Tops, and the Turtles.

After 11 years of providing early morning entertainment, Rege Cordic moved to KNX in Los Angeles. His replacements were Pallan and Bob Trow, whose "Pallan and Trow, Two For the Show" program retained some of the Cordic & Company flavor. Two and a half years later, in April 1968, Jack Bogut moved from Salt Lake City to become the KDKA morning host, a position he held for 15 years. One of Bogut's most memorable contributions to KDKA was his introduction to Western Pennsylvania of the word Farkleberry, which is now a staple of the annual Children's Hospital fund-raising campaign. Other notable personalities included Big Jack Armstrong, Bob Shannon and Terry McGovern; the latter two would go on to enjoy lucrative careers in the Film/TV industry as actors.

Also in the 1960s, KDKA reported numerous important events, including the Pirates' improbable 1960 World Series win. In local news reporting, the station pioneered with "on the scene" reports of Mike Levine, the peripatetic former newspaper man whose mobile-unit broadcasts from Tri-State-area covering fires, floods, bank robberies, and coal mine disasters won numerous journalism awards. His nightly "Contact" show (later "Open Mike") was KDKA's initial venture into the news-based talk radio format that would become the station's basic offering. In the summer of 1969, KDKA debuted overnight talk with Jack Wheeler, launching an anything-goes talk show that ran from midnight to 6 a.m. six nights a week.

=== 1970s ===
By the early 1970s, KDKA adopted more of an adult contemporary format, consisting of rock and roll hits of the 1960s plus soft rock, with artists such as America, The Carpenters, The Doobie Brothers, Paul Simon and Neil Diamond becoming core offerings. The morning show featured less music and an increased news and commercial content. In 1973, KDKA revamped its "Party Line" timeslot, with the bombastic John Cigna moving over from WJAS to anchor the nighttime talk program and urge listeners to "buy American!" In 1974 Perry Marshall replaced Wheeler in the overnight timeslot, which became known as the "Marshall's Office". In 1975, Roy Fox debuted as the 6 to 9 pm talk host. By now, KDKA had become a full service adult contemporary radio station.

In 1979, newsman Fred Honsberger began working at KDKA, and went on to host a successful evening talk show plus a top-rated afternoon drive program. Also in 1979, KDKA covered the Three Mile Island nuclear accident, first reported by Harrisburg newsman Mike Pintek. By 1982, Pintek joined the KDKA News staff and later became one of the station's most popular talk hosts, although he was let go at the end of 2005 as part of a programming overhaul. In 2007, he became the host of Night Talk on the Pittsburgh Cable News Channel. As of January 2009, Pintek was rehired at KDKA to host a 6 p.m. to 10 p.m. talk show, and, following the death of Fred Honsberger, took over the 12 noon-3 p.m. timeslot in January 2010. In July 2017, Pintek took a leave of absence to receive treatment for pancreatic cancer. He died on September 12, 2018.

=== 1980s ===
On July 23, 1982, KDKA claims to have become the world's first radio station to broadcast in AM stereo although experimental AM stereo broadcasts were conducted as early as the 1960s on Mexico's XETRA 690.

Throughout the 1980s, KDKA continued an information and news intensive adult contemporary music format, playing four to six songs per hour at drive times and 10 to 12 songs an hour during middays and weekends. At night, the station continued its talk format. The station won four Associated Press Joe Snyder awards for outstanding overall news service in Pennsylvania.

=== 1990s ===
KDKA eventually made the decision to switch from a full-service format that included music to one that was an exclusively news/talk. The changeover occurred at noon on April 10, 1992, when Larry Richert played the last song aired as a regular part of KDKA programming: Don McLean's "American Pie", signifying that, for KDKA, this was "the day the music died". Rush Limbaugh was added to the noon to 3:00 p.m. timeslot, and all-news blocks were added in the 6:00 to 9:00 a.m. and the 4:00 to 6:00 p.m. timeslots.

In 1997, Bob DeWitt was hired as news director, serving for two years. His award-winning team included Bob Kopler, Dave James, Bob Kmetz, Barbara Boylan, Mike Whitely and Beth Trapani.

Westinghouse merged with CBS in late 1995; KDKA would soon become an Infinity Broadcasting station, after that chain (a previously separate entity from CBS and Westinghouse) was acquired by Westinghouse a year later. Westinghouse would later turn itself into CBS Corporation in 1997. Viacom bought CBS Corporation in 1999, but five years later transformed itself into CBS Corporation, thus making KDKA a part of CBS Radio.

=== 2000–present ===
KDKA logo from 2002 to 2020; until 2006, a version referring to the station as "News Talk" instead of "Newsradio" was used. The typeface used for the frequency and call sign had been used in logos for KDKA since 1963, and was also used by the other Group W stations.

For the 2007 season, KDKA lost the radio rights to the Pittsburgh Pirates to WPGB.

On April 26, 2007, the East Pittsburgh building that was the birthplace for KDKA was razed to make way for an industrial complex.

In July 2008, CBS Corporation announced some of its radio stations were available for sale and the company would concentrate on its operations in major markets; as Pittsburgh was ranked as the 24th largest market by Arbitron there was speculation KDKA and its three sister stations, WBZW-FM (93.7, now KDKA-FM), WDSY-FM (107.9) and WZPT (100.7 FM, now WBZZ) would be sold. In September 2008, Radio-Info reported that KDKA was not for sale, even if CBS had received bids for its other Pittsburgh radio stations.

On Tuesday, November 2, 2010, KDKA celebrated its 90th anniversary with election coverage, as it had every first Tuesday in November since its debut in 1920. The 90th-anniversary celebration was primarily sponsored by Westinghouse Electric Company, a nuclear power company with a history dating back to the original Westinghouse Electric and Manufacturing Company.

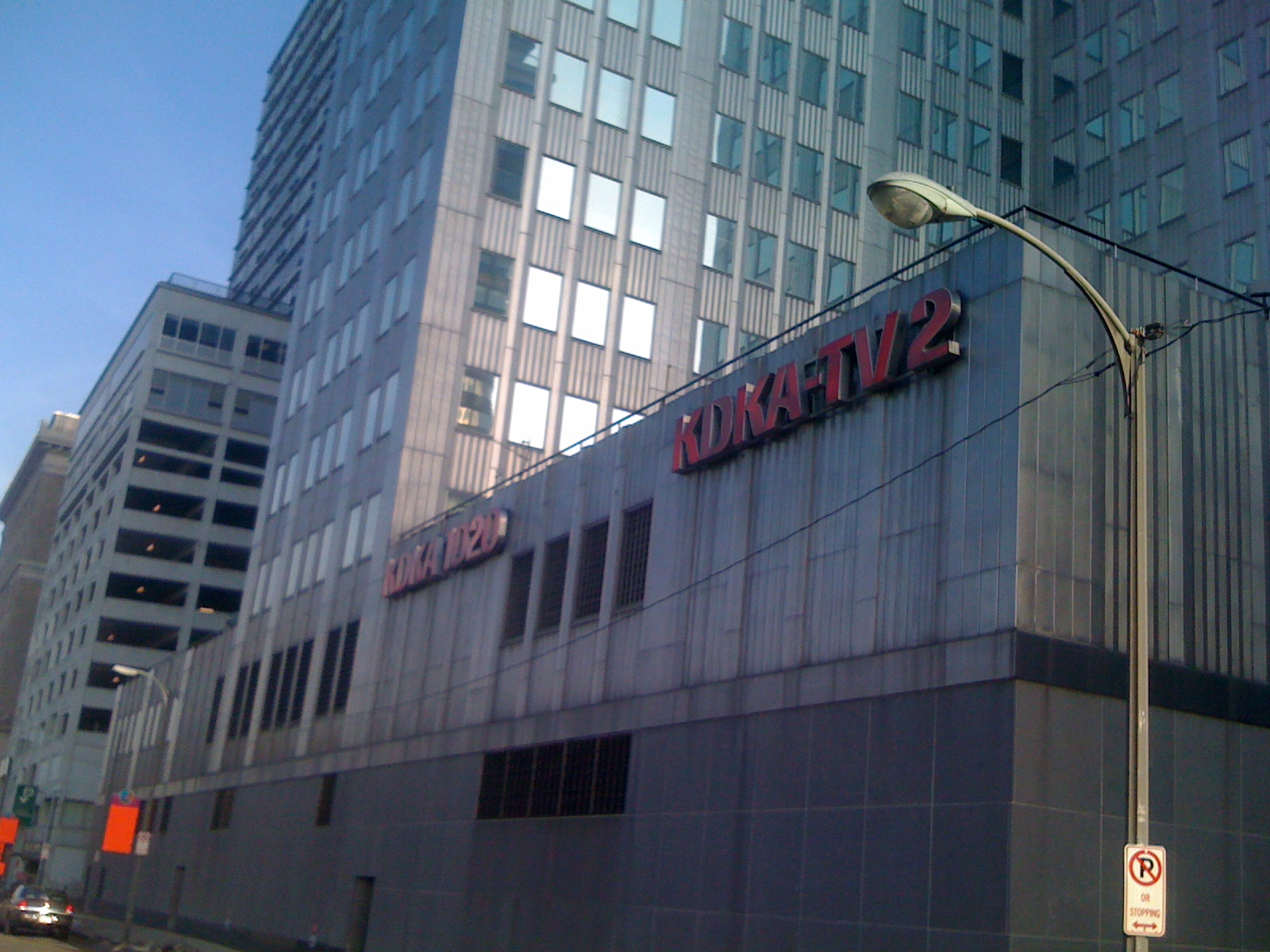
KDKA Radio's former studios in Pittsburgh's Gateway Center

KDKA radio left the One Gateway Center studios on November 12, 2010, joining CBS's other Pittsburgh radio stations on Holiday Drive in Green Tree. The Gateway Center facility still houses the studios of KDKA-TV.

Since the establishment of KDKA-FM as a sports talk station, KDKA has since been used as an overflow station for some of its sports rights, including the Pirates (whose rights returned to CBS Radio via KDKA-FM in 2012).

On February 2, 2017, CBS agreed to merge CBS Radio with Entercom, currently the fourth-largest radio broadcaster in the United States; the sale was conducted using a Reverse Morris Trust so that it would be tax-free. While CBS shareholders retained a 72% ownership stake in the combined company, Entercom was the surviving entity, separating KDKA radio (both 1020 and FM 93.7) from KDKA-TV and WPCW. The merger was approved on November 9, 2017, and was consummated on the 17th; the merger marked the first time since its establishment that KDKA has not been owned by a direct descendant of Westinghouse.

On September 10, 2018, host Marty Griffin was diagnosed with throat cancer.

On November 2, 2020, KDKA began simulcasting on FM translator station 100.1 W261AX; the move coincided with KDKA's 100th anniversary. As a translator station, W261AX's signal broadcasts at a lower power than KDKA's AM transmitter, and primarily serves Allegheny County.

Since 2021, KDKA simulcasts all weekday afternoon Pittsburgh Pirates games and select other games alongside KDKA-FM. KDKA also serves as the Pirates' backup radio station when KDKA-FM broadcasts the Pittsburgh Panthers.

== Priority claims ==
Trying to achieve a consensus on KDKA's precise status as a broadcasting pioneer, especially in relation to other, earlier stations, has been a source of disagreement for nearly a century. This often includes semantic complexities involving carefully crafted definitions and qualifiers – including "first", "oldest", "scheduled", "commercial", and "real" — in an attempt to make sense of a fluid and not always well documented era.

The U.S. government had no formal definition of broadcasting, or specific regulations, until December 1, 1921, when the existing Limited Commercial license category was amended to add a broadcast service subcategory for a select group of designated stations. (A license class dating back to 1912, not all Limited Commercial stations were authorized to make broadcasts.) Before these new regulations were adopted, there were no prohibitions restricting broadcasting stations from operating under amateur or experimental licenses. A specific "broadcasting station" license did not exist until one was created by the Federal Radio Commission in 1927.

In 1923 the Department of Commerce stated that "The first broadcasting license was issued in September, 1921", a reference to the September 15, 1921, Limited Commercial license issued to WBZ in Springfield, Massachusetts, which appears to be the first to state that the station would be used exclusively for broadcasting, transmitting on 360 meters, which would become the standard "entertainment" wavelength designated by December 1, 1921, regulations. It was only KDKA's second, November 7, 1921, license, that included a reference that it would be used for broadcasting in addition to company-wide point-to-point communication. This led to some early Commerce Department information listing WBZ as the first broadcasting station, and KDKA as the fourth.

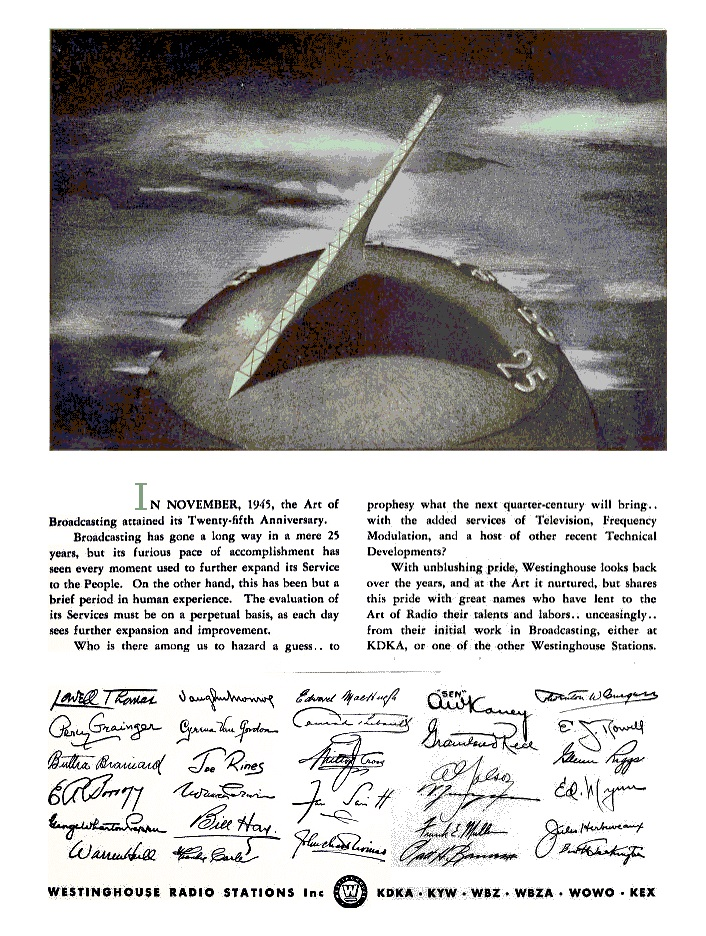
Westinghouse advertisement for KDKA's 25th anniversary (1945)

The best known priority dispute has been between KDKA and WWJ in Detroit, Michigan, a controversy in which some neutral observers have carefully tried to avoid being entangled. This was emphasized when the September 3, 1945, issue of Time magazine included a report that the National Association of Broadcasters (NAB) had recently sided with WWJ's "claim to being the world's first commercial radio station", by concluding that KDKA "was ten and a half weeks younger". This assertion brought a quick denial by NAB President J. Harold Ryan, who informed the magazine that it had misconstrued some informational material sent out by the association, and: "It was not the intention, nor is it the prerogative of the NAB to attempt to decide the relative claims of two pioneer broadcasting stations." In October Westinghouse withdrew its five stations from NAB membership, which Billboard magazine suggested was largely due to Westinghouse's dissatisfaction with how the NAB had handled KDKA's 25th anniversary.

It appears that Westinghouse officials were initially unaware that, in addition to Frank Conrad's 8XK, other stations had been making regular news and entertainment broadcasts. This was reflected in the slogan, repeated each week in Westinghouse's Radio Broadcasting News publication beginning with the January 1, 1922, debut issue, that "Westinghouse Station KDKA was first to give regular Broadcasting Programs". However, research has uncovered several challenges to this broad declaration.

In the United States, Charles "Doc" Herrold, in San Jose, California, was found to have begun test transmissions in 1909, which were followed by weekly concerts beginning in 1912. In addition, beginning in late 1916, Lee de Forest's "Highbridge station" (2XG) in New York City also began transmitting regularly scheduled programs, including a comprehensive November 7, 1916, election night broadcast. These programs were suspended in April 1917 with the entry of the United States into World War I, but after the war the 2XG broadcasts resumed in late 1919. The broadcasts were again suspended in early 1920, the result of a run-in with the local Radio Inspector. At this point the station's transmitter was transferred to San Francisco, and relicensed as 6XC, the "California Theater Station", which around April 1920 inaugurated a wide-ranging selection of daily broadcasts. The next year de Forest wrote that this was the "first radio-telephone station devoted solely" to broadcasting to the public. The station was relicensed as KZY late in 1921, then deleted in early 1923.

In 1946, a KDKA promotional pamphlet, issued under the name of the station's general manager, Joseph E. Baudino, stated that Westinghouse's November 2, 1920, election day effort marked "the world's first regularly scheduled broadcast". However, Baudino later modified this opinion, and as the lead author, along with John Kittross, of a 1977 review of "Broadcasting's Oldest Stations", now concluded that the "first U.S. radio broadcasting station" was in fact Charles Herrold's San Jose station, dating to 1912. Still, while allowing for the possibility that "new data will be found", the authors credited Baudino's former station, 8ZZ/KDKA, as being the "oldest [surviving] station in the nation".

Herrold's San Jose broadcasts had been suspended due to the World War I prohibition of civilian radio stations, and he did not return to the airwaves until May 1921. His experimental station was relicensed in December 1921 as KQW, which later moved to San Francisco and changed its call letters to KCBS in 1949. Baudino and Kittross argued that this post-World War I gap disqualified KCBS from "oldest station" consideration, something neither KQW nor KCBS has agreed with, as program schedules for KQW appearing in 1925 included the slogan "Pioneer Broadcasting Station of the World", and in 2009 KCBS celebrated its 100th birthday with a yearlong series of events throughout the Bay Area, including the public dedication of a plaque commemorating the "Centennial Celebration of the World's First Broadcasting Station". At the same time, KCBS adopted the slogan "The World's First Broadcasting Station".

Baudino and Kittross also concluded that there was no significant link between the daily broadcasts introduced on August 20, 1920, by the Detroit News' "Detroit News Radiophone", as amateur station 8MK, and its subsequent transformation into WBL and later WWJ, something with which the newspaper stoutly disagreed: for example, in a 1934 advertisement, WWJ, still owned by The Detroit News, declared itself "America's Pioneer Broadcasting Station".

A case has also been made for the primacy of the University of Wisconsin's WHA in Madison, Wisconsin, which evolved from an earlier experimental authorization, 9XM. In 1958 a plaque was installed on the university campus crediting "9XM-WHA" as "The Oldest Station in the Nation", including the statement that the station began "broadcasting on a regular schedule in 1919". However, Baudino and Kittross found no evidence of organized broadcasting prior to the inauguration of spoken-word weather forecasts on January 3, 1921, and in 2007 a comprehensive station history compiled by Randall Davidson came to the same conclusion.

An additional qualifier sometimes proposed for KDKA is that it was the first "commercial" station, but there is no consensus here either, as a 1945 advertisement for WWJ claimed that station was the one where "commercial radio began". (WWJ and KDKA were both initially commercial-free, and did not start to accept advertising until the mid-1920s, so in this case "commercial" appears to just mean under the control of a commercial enterprise.) Additionally, Westinghouse's operation of KDKA's broadcasting service under a "Limited Commercial" license appears to have been merely a side-effect of the fact that it had previously been determined that type of authorization was required for KDKA's original role, of providing private point-to-point communication between company installations.

== Shortwave operations ==
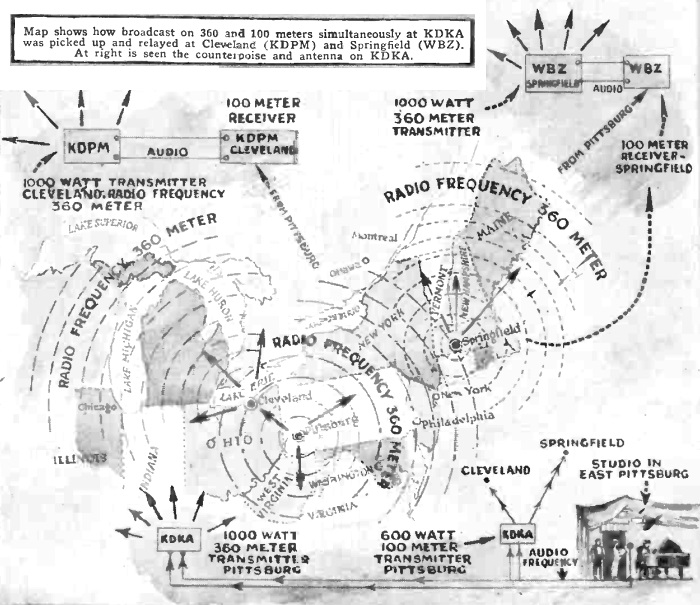
Diagram of shortwave links used by KDKA in East Pittsburgh for rebroadcasts by KDPM in Cleveland and WBZ East Springfield, Massachusetts (1923)

In 1923, KDKA began investigating simulcasting its broadcasts, using shortwave transmissions as a cheaper alternative to leasing long-distance telephone lines to transmit network programming between stations. Beginning on March 4, 1923, KDKA, in addition to its normal operation on 360 meters (833 kHz), transmitted on shortwave wavelengths from 80 to 100 meters (3,750 to 3,000 kHz), for local rebroadcasts on 360 meters by both KDPM in Cleveland, Ohio and WBZ in East Springfield, Massachusetts.

The shortwave relay to KDPM was judged to be successful. However, Westinghouse soon decided to move its relay target to the geographical center of the United States, and switched to a newly constructed station, KFKX in Hastings, Nebraska, beginning on November 22, 1923, which ended the relay transmissions to KDPM. Ultimately shortwave relays for network programming was determined to be inferior to dedicated telephone line connections, and the transmissions to KFKX ended, with the Hastings operation closing on June 1, 1927.

Responsibility for the shortwave transmissions was later transferred to separately licensed experimental stations. In 1922, a 1 kW shortwave transmitter was installed at Westinghouse's factory in East Pittsburgh, Pennsylvania, with call sign 8XS. This was joined by 8XAU in 1924, which, after the original 8XK was deleted later that year, changed its call sign to the historically significant 8XK, and then W8XK in 1929, with its transmitter power increasing to 40 kW by 1937.

The transmissions by W8XK were eventually expanded into an international service conducted independently of KDKA.

From 1923 to 1940, KDKA produced The Northern Messenger, airing it over its shortwave radio sister station 8XS (later known as W8XK and WPIT). The program was broadcast over shortwave to the Far North during the winter months, when mail service was impossible, and consisted of personal messages to RCMP officers, missionaries, trappers, and others from family and friends, music, and news.

In November 1942, Westinghouse's shortwave stations, along with all other U.S. shortwave stations, ended commercial operations and were leased to the Voice of America. As a VOA transmitter, the station broadcast to Europe and Africa for 12 years, before being dismantled.

== Controversies ==
In April 2020, KDKA Radio host Wendy Bell received criticism for her comment questioning whether COVID-19 lockdowns were necessary to save "less than 1% of our population", saying the measures were "going to bankrupt America and the future".

During a question and answer session in May 2020, KDKA talk show host Marty Griffin repeatedly misgendered Department of Health Secretary Dr. Rachel Levine, who previously served as the Pennsylvania Secretary of Health and was the first openly transgender official in state history. Griffin later apologized on Twitter. Pittsburgh Mayor Bill Peduto canceled an interview with KDKA due to the incident.

== See also ==
- List of initial AM-band station grants in the United States
