= WPGH =

WPGH is the call sign of two broadcast stations in Pittsburgh, Pennsylvania, United States:

- WPGH, the first student radio station at the University of Pittsburgh, which became WPTS-FM in 1986
- WPGH AM, 1080 AM, a radio station which operated in Pittsburgh from 1947 to 1954. The 1080 frequency is currently used by WWNL.
- WPGH-TV, a television station (channel 20, virtual 53)
