= WKST-FM =

Contemporary hit radio station in Pittsburgh

- Pittsburgh, Pennsylvania; United States
- Broadcast area: Greater Pittsburgh
- Frequency: 96.1 MHz (HD Radio)
- Branding: 96.1 KISS

Programming
- Format: Contemporary hit radio
- Subchannels: HD2: Pride Radio (LGBTQ+ electronic dance music and Top 40)
- Affiliations: Premiere Networks

Ownership
- Owner: iHeartMedia; (iHM Licenses, LLC)
- Sister stations: WBGG; WDVE; WPGB; WWSW-FM; WXDX-FM

History
- First air date: August 8, 1960
- Former call signs: WCAE-FM (1960–1961); WRYT-FM (1961–1966); WTAE-FM (1966–1977); WXKX (1977–1983); WHTX (1983–1991); WVTY (1991–1998); WDRV (1998–1999); WPHH (1999–2000)
- Call sign meaning: "Kiss" (the "T" substitutes for the second "S")

Technical information
- Licensing authority: FCC
- Facility ID: 65678
- Class: B
- ERP: 44,000 watts
- HAAT: 159 meters
- Transmitter coordinates: 40°23′49.2″N 79°57′42.2″W

Links
- Public license information: Public file; LMS
- Webcast: Listen live (via iHeartRadio)
- Website: 961kiss.iheart.com; HD2: prideradio.iheart.com

WKST-FM (96.1 MHz), is a commercial radio station licensed to Pittsburgh, Pennsylvania. The station is owned by iHeartMedia and airs a contemporary hit radio format, branded as 96.1 Kiss.

WKST operates with an Effective radiated power (ERP) of 44,000 watts, making it a class B station. The station broadcasts from a transmitter located in Baldwin, and its studios and offices are located on Abele Rd. in Bridgeville next to I-79.

== History ==
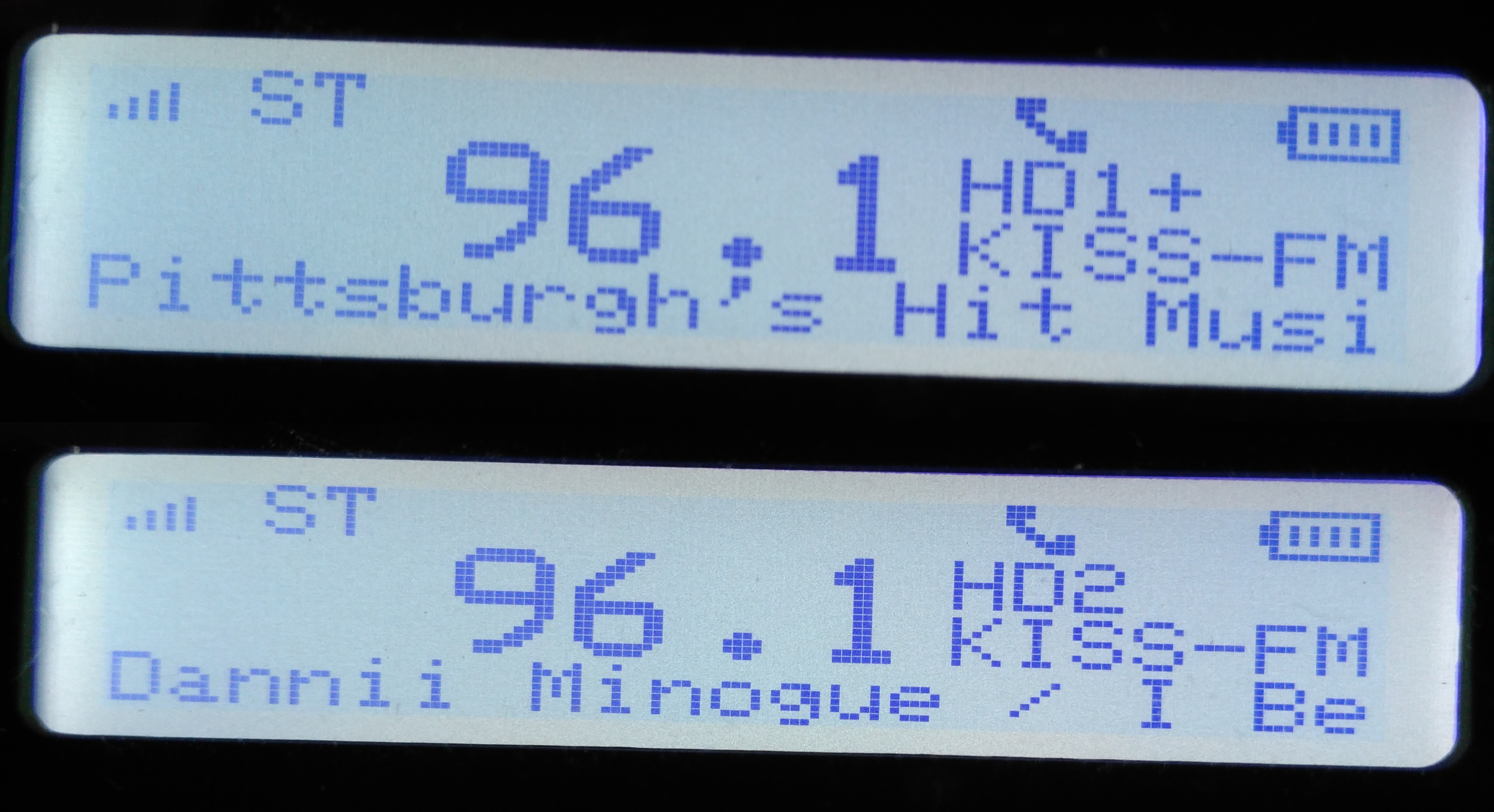
WKST's HD Radio Channels on a SPARC Radio with PSD.

The station signed on August 8, 1960, as WCAE-FM, co-owned with WCAE (AM) and WTAE-TV, and had a MOR format until 1976, when it simulcasted WTAE (AM) during the day and played disco at night, and became known as "Disco 96." As disco began to wane in popularity, the station flipped to a rock-leaning top 40 format as WXKX (96KX or "96 Kicks"). 96KX added live talent and thrived for the next five years, becoming the frequency's most highly rated format for three decades. WXKX also aired Pittsburgh Steelers games, including the Steelers' 35-31 victory over the Dallas Cowboys in Super Bowl XIII and the Steelers' 31-19 victory over the Los Angeles Rams in Super Bowl XIV. On January 17, 1983, faced with new competition from WBZZ (B-94), the station shifted to a more mainstream top 40 format and became "HitRadio 96." The call letters were changed to WHTX on March 25, 1983.

Later in the decade, the station evolved into a gold-based adult contemporary format as "Gold 96". On June 26, 1991, it switched calls to WVTY ("Variety 96") and format to an Adult Top 40 approach, which in turn would lead to a Modern AC format ("96.1 The River") beginning November 26, 1997. New call letters WDRV followed on February 27, 1998.

On February 12, 1999, at 5 pm, WDRV returned to Adult Top 40, this time as WPHH ("Mix 96.1"). On September 29, 2000, at 5 pm, it switched to a CHR format and became WKST-FM, "96.1 Kiss".

During its first four years, WKST waged a battle with WBZZ by countering WBZZ's conventional Top 40/CHR approach with WKST's Rhythmic flavor. In 2007, the rivalry resumed again when CBS revived "B94" and began going after the same 18-34 audience that WKST had managed to attract. However, B94 still could not compete with WKST-FM and would switch formats again, this time to sports talk in 2010. In 2012, WKST-FM became the first Top 40 (CHR) in Pittsburgh radio history to record No. 1 6+ and 12+ ratings.

== Programming ==
WKST initially favored rhythmic and dance hits before moving in a more mainstream direction. With B94 changing formats after Valentine's Day 2010, WKST-FM became the only top 40 station in Pittsburgh.

WKST is the Pittsburgh affiliate for "On Air with Ryan Seacrest" weekdays, the iHeartRadio Countdown on Saturday mornings, and "American Top 40" on Sunday mornings.

Local air staff on the station include Mikey & Big Bob of The Morning Freak Show, afternoon host Tall Cathy, night/weekend host Justin, weekend/fill-in host Kasper, and Club Kiss/weekend host DJ Bonics.

== WKST-FM HD2 ==
On April 25, 2006, iHeartMedia (then Clear Channel Communications), announced that WKST-FM's HD2 subchannel would carry a format focusing on Dance hits. The HD2 signed on July 17, 2006, broadcasting the Club Phusion format, which was later replaced with the EDM-focused Evolution brand. In 2015, WKST-FM HD2 changed formats to "My 2K," a 2000s hits format. In March 2016, My 2K moved to WXDX-FM HD2, and was replaced with Pride Radio.
