= DJ Bonics =

American disk jockey (born 1980)

- Born: Brandon Glova; September 4, 1980 (age 45); Philadelphia, Pennsylvania, US
- Other name: Bonicto
- Education: University of Pittsburgh
- Occupations: Disc jockey; record producer; remixer
- Years active: 2000s–present
- Musical career
- Origin: Pittsburgh, Pennsylvania, US
- Genres: Club; electro; EDM; hip hop; house; trap; turntablism
- Instruments: Turntable; Sampler
- Label: Taylor Gang
- Website: www.djbonics.com

Brandon Glova (born September 4, 1980), better known by his stage name DJ Bonics, is a hip hop disk jockey for Wiz Khalifa and former radio DJ.

== Career ==
DJ Bonics worked for seven years as the mixer and afternoon drive DJ for WKST-FM, a Kiss-FM station in Pittsburgh, Pennsylvania. After leaving WKST-FM in 2010, he became the official DJ for Wiz Khalifa. He has also done solo shows. Previously, he DJ'd in Minneapolis, MN for 95.3 GO Radio.

== Personal life ==
DJ Bonics is Filipino. DJ Bonics is a graduate of the University of Pittsburgh, where he was a member of Zeta Beta Tau fraternity. In December 2010, a few days after returning from his first tour with Wiz Khalifa, DJ Bonics had a heart attack caused by a blocked artery. He underwent surgery, quickly recovered, and began performing with Wiz Khalifa again within a week. After the incident, he participated in a benefit to benefit the American Heart Association in Pittsburgh. In addition, he formed the Bonics Heartbeats Foundation to promote healthy living.
