= Fred Honsberger =

American radio personality (1951–2009)

- "Vintage Fred Back in his Heyday"
- Born: May 15, 1951
- Died: December 16, 2009 (aged 58); Monroeville, Pennsylvania
- Occupation: Radio host
- Children: 2

Fred Honsberger (May 15, 1951 – December 16, 2009) was an American radio personality for News Radio 1020 KDKA in Pittsburgh, Pennsylvania. His show most recently aired from noon–3 pm weekdays, between Marty Griffin's The Inside Story and the KDKA Afternoon News.

== Radio broadcasting career at KDKA ==
In 1979, Honsberger joined the KDKA team as a reporter. Honsberger was later promoted to News Director of the station in 1984 and remained in the role until 1989, when he began his career as a talk show host in the drive time slot of 3-5 PM weekdays.

=== The Fred Honsberger Program ===
Airing on KDKA Monday to Friday between 12 and 3 PM, Honsberger talked about local and national news and politics and opinion. He also took callers and conducted interviews during the show.

The last segment of the show (usually around 2:50 PM) featured "The Honz Honk Off Line" which consisted of select listener voice mail messages that were called in from the day before or earlier and replayed over the air.

Thursdays were "Honzman text it Thursdays" in which a yes or no question was posed to the audience. A number was given to send a text message to and the results are shared usually before the last segment of the show.

Fridays were "Beatle Bumper Fridays" in which all of the bumper music consisted of The Beatles or one of the members' solo works. In addition to the Beatle bumper music, Fred also was known to play "Thank God It's Friday (song)" by the disco group Love and Kisses as the bumper music at the top of each hour on Fridays.

Every show ended with Honsberger signing off over The Beatles' "Sgt. Peppers' Lonely Hearts Club Band (reprise)" followed by Pittsburgh Penguins broadcaster Mike Lange saying "Ladies and gentlemen, the Honz has just left the building!"

The show was produced by a collection of producers including Greg Jena, Heather Richmond Zambito, Amy Muntean Mauk and "The Big Show Producer" Robert Suhr.

Honsberger underwent gastric bypass surgery in 2004 and during his rehab stint he broadcast from his home studio until he was able to return to the KDKA studios. He suffered a broken leg in 2007. While he was undergoing physical therapy, Kevin Miller filled in for him.

Honsberger's final live show was on December 8, 2009.

== Other work ==
Honsberger also appeared on the panel of WQED-TV's "OnQ" and its Spin-Off "OffQ" programs since the show began in 2000. He also hosted PCNC's "Honsberger Live", his own live TV call-in program, between 1999 and 2009.

He was a supporter of the Salvation Army.

== Awards and achievements ==
Along with a team of reporters, Honsberger was given the Dupont Award for his in-depth coverage of the Three Mile Island nuclear disaster in 1979. He was a two-time winner of the Radio and Television News Director Association's award for excellence in radio news; he has won a Golden Quill Award for his radio special about the Pittsburgh police under cover drug squad; he has been named Best Talk Show Host by the Achievement in Radio awards in 1997, 2003 and 2005; and the Associated Press named his show the Best Radio Talk Show in Pennsylvania in 2004, 2005, 2006 and 2007.

== Death ==
The station reported that Honsberger died at home following a lengthy battle with medical issues. He was survived by a wife and two sons.

Following his death, the Pittsburgh Post-Gazette described him as a "Pittsburgh icon" with "affectionate yinzer spirit" on par with Fred Rogers and Myron Cope.

KDKA Radio named Mike Pintek as the new host of the 12-3PM weekday time slot on Thursday, January 28, 2010. After the announcement, Honsberger's longtime friend and coworker had this to say about being named the new host for the time slot, "A lot of people have asked me, 'Who's going to replace Fred? Who's going to fill his shoes?' I'm filling the slot. I'm not going to even try to fill his shoes. Nobody can."
