= WAMO (AM) =

- Wilkinsburg, Pennsylvania; United States
- Broadcast area: Pittsburgh metropolitan area
- Frequency: 660 kHz
- Branding: WAMO 107.3

Programming
- Format: Urban contemporary
- Affiliations: Compass Media Networks

Ownership
- Owner: Martz Communications Group; (Radio Power, Inc.)
- Operator: Audacy, Inc.
- Sister stations: KDKA; KDKA-FM; WBZZ; WDSY-FM

History
- First air date: August 25, 1960 (as WWML at 1470)
- Former call signs: WWML (1960–1978); WRML (1978–1980); WZGO (1980–1993); WHYM (1993–1994); WZGO (1994–1997); WFJY (1997–2004); WCIX (2004); WPYT (2004–2011)
- Former frequencies: 1470 kHz (1960–2004)
- Call sign meaning: "Allegheny, Monongahela, Ohio" (Three rivers that meet in Pittsburgh)

Technical information
- Licensing authority: FCC
- Facility ID: 25732
- Class: D
- Power: 1,400 watts day
- Transmitter coordinates: 40°24′47″N 79°51′14″W
- Translator: 107.3 W297BU (Pittsburgh)
- Repeater: 107.9 WDSY-FM HD2 (Pittsburgh)

Links
- Public license information: Public file; LMS
- Webcast: Listen live (via Audacy)
- Website: audacy.com/wamo1073

WAMO (660 kHz) is a commercial AM radio station licensed to Wilkinsburg, Pennsylvania, and serving the Pittsburgh metropolitan area. It broadcasts an urban contemporary radio format, is owned by the Martz Communications Group and is operated by Audacy, Inc., under a local marketing agreement (LMA).

Its studios and AM transmitter are located in Braddock, east of Pittsburgh.

By day, WAMO is powered at 1,400 watts. To protect the nighttime signal of Class A station WFAN in New York City on the same frequency, WAMO is a daytimer, required to go off the air at night. Programming is also heard on 250-watt FM translator W297BU (107.3 MHz) in Pittsburgh. It uses the FM dial position in its moniker WAMO 107.3.

== History ==
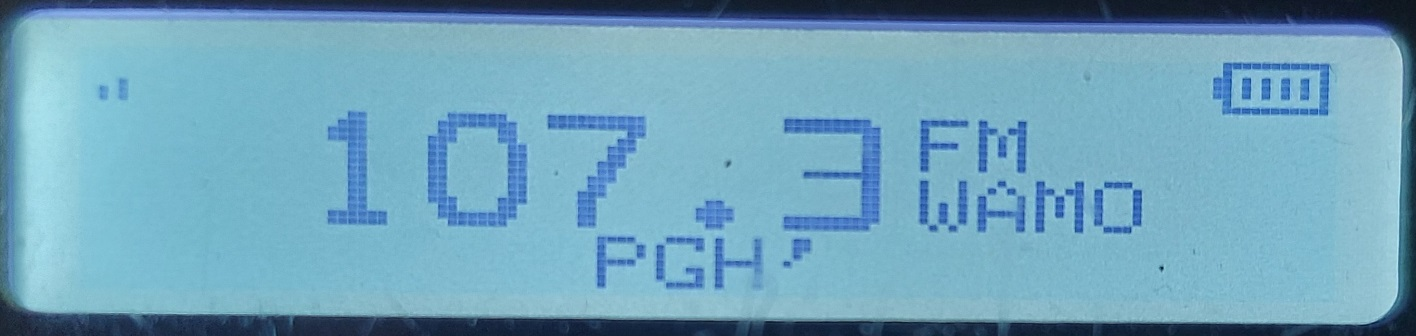
WAMO's translator on a SPARC HD Radio with RDS.

=== Early years ===
The station signed on the air on August 25, 1960. Initially, the station broadcast on 1470 kHz in Portage, Pennsylvania, halfway between Johnstown and Altoona, under the call sign WWML. It operated as a daytime-only station.

It saw numerous changes in format (usually between country and oldies) and call sign; it was variously known as WWML, WRML, WHYM, WZGO, and WFJY. In 1990, 1470 finally received permission from the Federal Communications Commission to operate at night with a limited power of 88 watts. Though successful financially in its earlier years, the station and its FM sister, then known as WZGO, experienced a sharp decline during the mid 1980s, as did the local economy, in part due to the collapse of the region's steel-producing and coal-mining industries.

=== Move to Pittsburgh area ===
Logo as "WAMO 100"

Under FCC rules which permit a station owner to move a daytime-only station and change its frequency, WFJY was relocated to the Pittsburgh area with a new frequency and city of license around 2004. On 660, the station first signed on with the callsign WCIX, before changing to WPYT.

The station formerly carried programming from then-owner Alex Langer's National Radio Network programming lineup until the network ceased operations in March 2010. Martz planned to put an urban/urban AC format on the station, returning this programming to the Pittsburgh market for the first time since WAMO (860 AM) and WAMO-FM (106.7) were sold to Catholic broadcasters in 2009.

On May 21, 2011, WPYT and translator W261AX (100.1 FM) signed on with the promised mainstream urban format, but have always had a shift towards rhythmic contemporary. At the end of 2011, they changed their slogan to "Pittsburgh's home for Hip-hop and Hottest Hits" and became an official rhythmic contemporary station.

On June 3, 2011, the station changed its call sign to WAMO, marking the return of the callsign and format after two years. This is WAMO's fourth incarnation in Pittsburgh, as it originally broadcast on 860 AM, later with a simulcast on 105.9 FM before being moved to 106.7 in 1996.

In January 2013, WAMO was added to BDS' Rhythmic Airplay panel as an indicator reporter, but is not considered a monitored reporter because it is not rated in Nielsen Audio (as Martz is a non-subscriber) and in part due to being an AM daytimer with an FM translator. This occurred in spite of the station's primary emphasis on R&B/Hip-Hop material. That changed by 2017 when it became a monitored R&B/Hip-Hop reporter in both BDS and Mediabase.

BDS then returned WAMO back to the Rhythmic panel as a monitored reporter in February 2019, due to an adjustment in its musical direction.

=== Urban adult contemporary ===
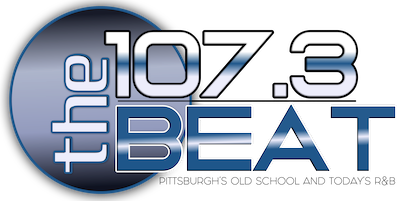
Logo as "107.3 The Beat"

On June 25, 2019, at 11 a.m., WAMO changed formats from rhythmic contemporary (which continued on WBZZ-HD3 and W261AX) to urban adult contemporary, branded as "107.3 The Beat"; the branding referred to WAMO's new FM translator, W297BU (107.3). On October 16, 2020, WAMO announced that the "WAMO 100" hip hop programming would move to 107.3 on November 2, marking the fourth FM frequency to carry the "WAMO" brand and the return of the hip hop format to the 660 frequency; W261AX was concurrently repurposed as an FM translator for KDKA (1020 AM). On March 22, 2022, it was announced that Audacy would purchase the WAMO intellectual property, and begin operating the station on April 4 via a local marketing agreement.

On November 18, 2022, Martz announced that it would donate the WAMO license to Pittsburgh Public Media, owner of WZUM and WZUM-FM. Following the donation's completion, the urban contemporary format will only be heard on W297BU and on the HD2 channel of Audacy-owned WDSY-FM; the move followed the expiration of a four-year window requiring W297BU to operate as a WAMO translator. However, as of 2024, the sale had yet to take place, with Audacy still controlling the station.

== Translators ==
Broadcast translator for WAMO
| Call sign | Frequency | City of license | FID | ERP (W) | HAAT | Class | Transmitter coordinates | FCC info |
|---|---|---|---|---|---|---|---|---|
| W297BU | 107.3 FM | Wilkinsburg, Pennsylvania | 157117 | 250 | 115 m (377 ft) | D | 40°24′46.8″N 79°51′13.8″W | LMS |
