= W261AX =

Translator for KDKA Pittsburgh
- Pittsburgh, Pennsylvania; United States
- Broadcast area: Pittsburgh metropolitan area
- Frequency: 100.1 MHz
- Branding: 100.1 FM and AM 1020 KDKA

Programming
- Format: News/talk
- Affiliations: ABC News Radio; KDKA-TV; Westwood One; CNBC Radio; Pittsburgh Pirates Radio Network; NFL on Westwood One

Ownership
- Owner: Martz Communications Group; (Radio Power, Inc.)
- Operator: Audacy, Inc.

History
- First air date: May 21, 2011; 15 years ago
- Call sign meaning: sequentially assigned

Technical information
- Licensing authority: FCC
- Facility ID: 150026
- Class: D
- Power: 99 watts
- Transmitter coordinates: 40°24′47″N 79°51′14″W

Links
- Public license information: Public file; LMS
- Webcast: Listen live (via Audacy)
- Website: www.audacy.com/kdkaradio

W261AX is a translator station serving the Pittsburgh, Pennsylvania market, broadcasting on 100.1 MHz on the FM dial with a power of 99 watts. The station is owned by the Martz Communications Group (through its Radio Power subsidiary), but broadcasts the programming of Audacy, Inc.-owned news/talk station KDKA (1020 AM). From 2011 to 2020, the translator carried a mainstream urban format, for most of that time in conjunction with Martz-owned WAMO (660 AM). Audacy operates the station.

== Station history ==
Current KDKA (AM) 's translator on a SPARC HD Radio with RDS from 2021.

Former Logo as "WAMO 100"

W261AX signed on the air May 21, 2011, serving as a rebroadcast translator for WPYT at 660 AM, airing a mainstream urban format (though it leaned in a rhythmic direction), resurrecting the "WAMO" branding. On June 3, 2011, WPYT changed its call sign to WAMO, marking the return of the callsign to the market after two years. This was WAMO's fourth incarnation in Pittsburgh, as it originally broadcast on 860 AM, later with a simulcast on 105.9 FM before being moved to 106.7 in 1996, which ran until its 2009 demise. At the end of 2011, the station changed its slogan to "Pittsburgh's Home for Hip-hop and Hottest Hits", and became an official rhythmic contemporary station. In 2017, the station added another translator, W297BU (107.3 FM), and in 2018, an HD simulcast via WBZZ-HD3, expanding its reach in the area.

In January 2013, WAMO was added to BDS' Rhythmic Airplay panel as an indicator reporter, but is not considered a monitored reporter because it is not rated in Nielsen Audio (as Martz is a non-subscriber) and in part due to being an AM daytimer with an FM translator, this despite having a primary emphasis on R&B/Hip-Hop material. That would change by 2017, when it became a monitored R&B/Hip-Hop reporter in both BDS and Mediabase. BDS would return WAMO back to the Rhythmic panel as a monitored reporter in February 2019 due to an adjustment in its musical direction, with Mediabase moving the station to its Rhythmic panel the following July.

On June 25, 2019, at 11 a.m., WAMO/W297BU changed their format to urban adult contemporary, branded as "107.3 The Beat". The previous rhythmic format remained on W261AX and WBZZ-HD3, and continued to use the WAMO call letters in their branding. On October 16, 2020, Martz announced that the "WAMO 100" branding and hip hop format would return to 107.3 FM and 660 AM on November 2. W261AX was concurrently repurposed as an FM translator for KDKA (1020 AM), a move announced by KDKA owner Entercom on October 19; the move coincided with KDKA's 100th anniversary.
