= WWSW-FM =

Classic hits radio station in Pittsburgh

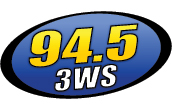
- Pittsburgh, Pennsylvania; United States
- Broadcast area: Pittsburgh metropolitan area
- Frequency: 94.5 MHz (HD Radio)
- Branding: 94.5 3WS

Programming
- Format: Classic hits
- Subchannels: HD2: TikTok Radio; HD3: Relevant Radio (Catholic radio)
- Affiliations: Premiere Networks

Ownership
- Owner: iHeartMedia, Inc.; (iHM Licenses, LLC)
- Sister stations: WBGG, WDVE, WKST-FM, WPGB, WXDX-FM

History
- First air date: December 12, 1940; 85 years ago
- Former call signs: W47P (1940–1943); WTNT (1943–1945); WMOT (1945–1949); WWSW-FM (1949–1973); WPEZ (1973–1980)
- Former frequencies: 43.5 MHz (1940); 44.7 MHz (1940–1945)
- Call sign meaning: Originally used on the former WWSW 970 AM (now WBGG)

Technical information
- Licensing authority: FCC
- Facility ID: 59968
- Class: B
- ERP: 50,000 watts
- HAAT: 247 meters (810 ft)
- Transmitter coordinates: 40°27′48.2″N 80°0′17.1″W
- Translator: HD3: 106.3 W292DH (Pittsburgh)

Links
- Public license information: Public file; LMS
- Webcast: Listen live (via iHeartRadio); HD3: Listen Live
- Website: 3wsradio.iheart.com HD3: relevantradio.com

WWSW-FM (94.5 MHz) – branded 94.5 3WS – is a commercial radio station that is located in Pittsburgh, Pennsylvania. It airs a classic hits radio format and switches to all–Christmas music for most of November and December each year.

This station is owned by iHeartMedia, Inc. Its studios and offices are located on Abele Rd. in Bridgeville next to I-79, along with its sister stations. The transmitter is situated off Rising Main Avenue at Lanark Street, on a tower that is shared with WPXI-TV and other FM stations in the Pittsburgh radio market. WWSW-FM broadcasts using HD Radio technology, with its second digital subchannel airing iHeartRadio's "TikTok Radio" service, and its third digital subchannel airing Catholic radio programming from Relevant Radio.

WWSW is notable for being an FM "superpower station". Its effective radiated power (ERP) is 50,000 watts on a tower that is 247 meters (810 ft) tall. The standard height above average terrain (HAAT) for Class B FM signals found in Pennsylvania is 152 meters (500 ft) for a station broadcasting at 50,000 watts.

== History ==
=== Early years ===
On August 13, 1940, Walker & Downing Radio Corporation applied to the Federal Communications Commission (FCC) for a construction permit to build a new FM station. It broadcast on 43.5 MHz in the original FM broadcast band, which was located between 42 and 50 MHz. The FCC granted the permit on December 12, 1940, while reallocating the station to 44.7 MHz and assigning the station the call sign W47P. The station was granted its first license by the FCC on May 20, 1942. On September 23, 1942, the FCC modified the station's license when Walker & Downing Radio Corporation changed its name to WWSW, Inc., named after co-owned WWSW (970 AM).

On November 1, 1943, the station was assigned the WTNT call sign, followed by another call sign change to WMOT effective October 3, 1945.

The FCC created the current FM broadcast band on June 27, 1945. The commission granted WWSW, Inc. the authority to cease operations effective December 12, 1945, so the station could be converted to a new frequency on the new band.

On July 25, 1946, the FCC reallocated the station to 94.5 MHz, and granted WWSW, Inc. a construction permit for operation on the new frequency effective November 13, 1947. On February 24, 1949, the call sign was changed to WWSW-FM. Following a series of modifications to the construction permit from 1947 to 1954, the FCC granted the station a new license with the new facilities on January 11, 1954.

The station's license was voluntarily reassigned to WWSW Radio, Inc. effective August 1, 1955. On December 21, 1957, the FCC granted the new owner a construction permit to increase the station's effective radiated power (ERP) to 50,000 watts while increasing the antenna height above average terrain (HAAT) to 940 feet. A new license with the upgraded facilities was granted by the FCC on September 25, 1958.

Due to subsequent regulations adopted by the FCC that significantly limit the height placement for Class B FM stations corresponding to their ERP, WWSW-FM is recognized as a grandfathered “superpower” station.

WWSW Radio, Inc. was granted a construction permit by the FCC on August 6, 1967, to install a new transmitter and antenna. The permit lowered the station's HAAT to 810 feet. The FCC granted a new license with the new facilities on August 1, 1969.

=== Top 40 hits ===
Until the late 1960s, WWSW-FM had mostly simulcast its AM counterpart on 970 AM. By this point, the FCC was requiring AM-FM combo stations to offer separate programming for most of the broadcast day; as a result, WWSW-FM switched to an automated Top 40 format with limited interruptions, while WWSW (AM) remained a Top 40 station with live disc jockeys and hourly newscasts.

On November 18, 1973, the station's call sign was changed to WPEZ, carving out its own identity apart from WWSW. WPEZ was a successful Top 40 station for the next seven years. On Labor Day, 1980, the station gave up Top 40 hits for an adult contemporary format. The station's call sign was changed back to WWSW-FM on September 28, 1980.

For most of the 1980s, WWSW-FM began to add more oldies titles into its playlist to distinguish it from other Pittsburgh AC stations.

=== Oldies ===
The AM and FM stations both flipped to all-oldies in February 1988, simulcasting for part of the time. When not simulcasting, the FM played a core blend of oldies hits from the 1950s, 1960s and early 1970s, while the AM leaned more towards 1950s and early 1960s titles. In 1991, the AM's independent programming was abandoned and began simulcasting the FM full-time.

The AM split from the FM in August 2000 and adopted a sports radio format as WBGG. In 2006, Pitt Panthers football and basketball games would be aired on WWSW-FM. This lasted until 2012, when the team's games switched to KDKA-FM.

=== Classic hits ===
Like many FM oldies stations in the early 2000s, WWSW-FM had been de-emphasizing music of the 1950s and 1960s in favor of more songs from the 1970s and a few early 1980s titles. It also stopped using the word "oldies" on the air.

In 2006, the music was adjusted forward with some 1970s hits and a larger selection of 1980s titles.

The station started to play artists it had ignored before, including Styx, Huey Lewis & the News, Prince and Bruce Springsteen, while dropping long-time staples of an earlier vintage like the Dave Clark Five, Little Richard, Gary Lewis and the Playboys and Herman's Hermits. However, The Beatles and Motown continued to be a staple of the station's playlist.

By the 2010s, the only 1960s tracks that remain on the station's playlist were those that had a high level of popularity over the years, including songs by The Beatles, Simon and Garfunkel, The Supremes, and The Rolling Stones. In addition, the station began to incorporate some tracks from the early 1990s into the playlist, including hits from Bryan Adams, R.E.M., Prince and Sheryl Crow. The station's playlist began focusing on the mid-1970s all the way up through 1989, with a few late 1960s, early 1970s, and early 1990s tracks also getting airtime.

By 2026 very few 1960s hits remained on the air. Less 1970s hits were played as the station favored many 1980s and 1990s songs. There were also a mix of some early 2000s songs that hit the air as well.

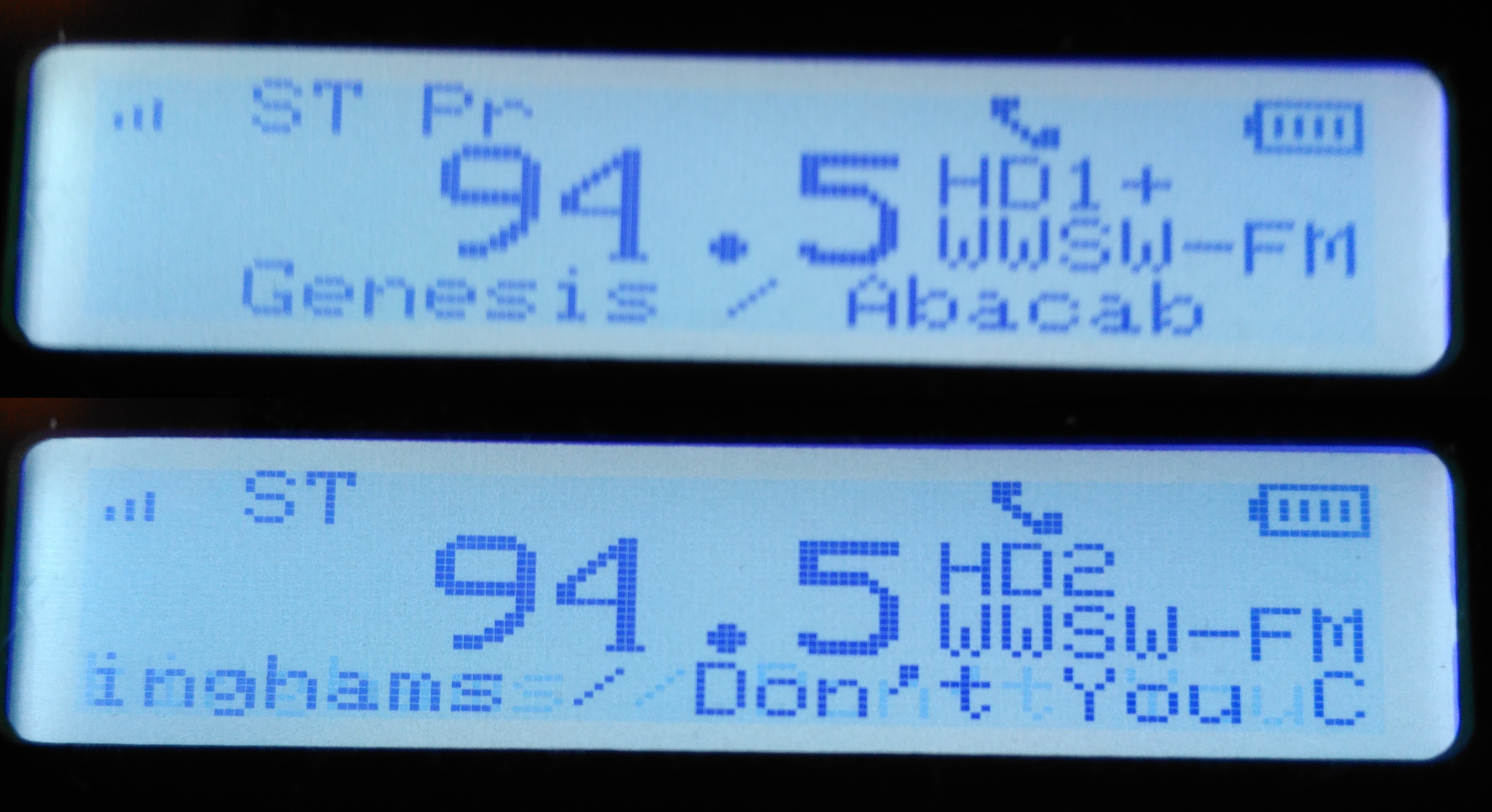
WWSW's HD Radio Channels on a SPARC Radio with PSD.

=== Concerts and awards ===
The station had oldies concerts that filled Three Rivers Stadium many times with oldies acts, and even legendary oldies DJ Wolfman Jack made an appearance on February 23, 1991. The station received three Marconi Awards for best oldies station in the United States, while the morning show received five AIR awards (Achievement in Radio) for best morning show in Pittsburgh.

== Christmas Music ==
WWSW-FM Christmas Logo

Beginning each year in early to mid-November, WWSW switches to all Christmas music as "Pittsburgh's Official Christmas Station". This includes both classic Christmas standards and some recent material. During the holidays, WWSW suspends some features such as the "All Request Cafe," "The Ultimate Radio Party" and replays of 1970s/1980s versions of American Top 40. The Christmas Music format competes with WSHH, another Pittsburgh station that flips to Christmas music as well.

== Air Staff ==
Currently, WWSW has four local airstaffers - Jonny Hartwell (weekdays 5-10 a.m.), Tall Cathy (weekdays 10 a.m.-2 p.m.), Kasper (weekdays 2-7 p.m.), and Program Director David Edgar (weekdays 7 p.m.-12 a.m. and weekends). Outside this time, the station features several out-of-town voice trackers as well as some syndicated programming.

Past air personalities on 3WS include Jim Merkel, Gary Dickson, Kenny Woods, Steve Hansen, Cris Winter, Bumper Morgan (deceased), RD Summers (deceased), Theresa Colaizzi, Ray Walker (deceased), Clarke Ingram, Lani Daniels, Mike Steele (deceased), Steve Grenato, Sheri Van Dyke, Mike Frazer, Val Porter, Bonny Diver, and Kate Harris. During the prime years at 3WS, the morning show featured Merkel and Dickson.

Longtime air personality Jim Merkel was released from 3WS on October 4, 2010, after more than thirty-one years on the station; Sheri Van Dyke after thirty years on November 6, 2020; and Mike Frazer after thirty-six years on April 13, 2026.

== WWSW-FM HD2 ==
On April 25, 2006, WWSW-FM's HD2 subchannel began carrying a format focusing on Rhythmic Oldies, which was originally heard on the former WJJJ (104.7 FM).

In 2016, when 3WS cancelled its weekly "Sunday Night Diner" program, the format of the HD2 station was changed to 1950s and 60s oldies, similar to what was heard on the diner program each week. In addition, the subchannel carried Duquesne Dukes football and men's basketball games, as well as pre-game, post-game, and coaches shows for both sports.

A couple of years later, the HD2 station moved its focus to 1960s and 70s oldies, and was branded as "3WS HD2."
