= Marty Griffin (journalist) =

American journalist (born 1959)

- Born: June 12, 1959 (age 67); Pittsburgh, Pennsylvania, U.S.
- Education: Ohio University
- Occupation: Investigative reporter
- Notable credit(s): KDKA-TV; The Inside Story with Marty Griffin
- Spouse: Kristine Sorensen
- Children: 3

⁸

Marty Griffin (born June 12, 1959) is an American investigative reporter and radio talk show host working for KDKA-TV and KDKA radio in Pittsburgh, Pennsylvania. A native of Pittsburgh, he attended Ohio University and began working as a journalist in Wichita Falls, Texas before moving to Dallas, Texas where he was an investigative reporter for NBC affiliate KXAS. In 2003 he returned to Pittsburgh to work for KDKA-TV and KDKA Radio. He also hosts The Inside Story with Marty Griffin on KDKA Radio.

In 2005, he was found guilty of defiant trespass by the Allegheny County Court of Common Pleas after an investigative report supposedly showing lax security at a Port Authority of Allegheny County bus garage. In 2006, that charge was overturned on freedom of speech grounds.

In November 2006, Brent Dugan, 60, a minister at Community Presbyterian Church of Ben Avon, committed suicide in a Mercer County motel room after Griffin had confronted him for visiting an adult bookstore in suburban McKeesport. Dugan was never named, but was seen in televised promotions for the piece, which KDKA never aired after learning Dugan may have been a threat to himself.

In May 2020, he repeatedly misgendered Dr. Rachel Levine, the Pennsylvania Secretary of Health, and the first openly trans official in state history, during a question and answer session, prompting him to apologize on Twitter.
