= WWNL =

Coordinates: 40°36′17″N 79°57′37″W

- WWNL 1080 Logo
- Pittsburgh, Pennsylvania; United States
- Broadcast area: Pittsburgh metropolitan area
- Frequency: 1080 kHz

Programming
- Format: Christian

Ownership
- Owner: Steel City Radio, Inc.

History
- First air date: 1947 (as WILY)
- Former call signs: WDSY (1992); WEEP (1992–1995); WDSY (1995–1997); WPGR (1997–1999)

Technical information
- Licensing authority: FCC
- Facility ID: 18517
- Class: D
- Power: 50,000 watts day 25,000 watts critical hours
- Translator: 103.9 W280FG (Pittsburgh)

Links
- Public license information: Public file; LMS
- Webcast: WWNL 1080 Listen Live; WWNL 103.9 Listen Live
- Website: WWNL 1080 Online; WWNL 103.9 Online

WWNL (1080 AM) is a commercial radio station in Pittsburgh, Pennsylvania, USA. It broadcasts a Christian talk and teaching radio format and is owned by Steel City Radio, Inc. Programming is supplied by the Wilkins Radio Network. WWNL features local and national religious leaders, including Charles Stanley, John MacArthur, David Jeremiah and Michael Youssef. WWNL is a brokered programming station, where hosts pay for time slots on WWNL and may seek donations to their ministries during their shows.

By day, WWNL is powered at 50,000 watts, the maximum permitted for AM radio stations in the United States. Because AM 1080 is a clear channel frequency reserved for Class A stations KRLD Dallas and WTIC Hartford, WWNL is a daytimer, required to sign off the air at night. During critical hours, WWNL is powered at 25,000 watts. It uses a directional antenna at all times. The transmitter, with a four-tower array, is off Lah Road in Gibsonia, Pennsylvania.

== History ==
=== WILY and WEEP ===
In 1947, the station signed on the air, using WILY as its call sign. It primarily served Pittsburgh's African American audience in the 1950s. In 1957, it became WEEP, a Top 40 station, before switching to the call letters WYRE in 1961 and then back to WEEP.

=== Country music ===
Unable to compete with KQV in the Top 40 format, WEEP changed to country music in 1965, in which it enjoyed its greatest success. Most large cities in the north did not have a radio station playing country and western music, so WEEP was alone in the format for many years. Based on WEEP's good ratings, the owners switched WEEP-FM (now WDSY-FM) to country music as well, a first such FM station in Pittsburgh. Other than a one-year period with a talk radio format in 1976, WEEP broadcast a country format for almost 30 years.

By the 1980s, WEEP and WDSY simulcast part of the day, before WEEP changed to an oldies format on December 15, 1986. In September 1990, it adopted an all-business news and talk format.

In February 1992, the call letters were changed to WDSY and the station became a full time simulcast of WDSY-FM's country format. This was short-lived with the AM station going back to the WEEP call letters and affiliating with the Satellite Music Network's "Real Country" format delivered via satellite in September 1992. It returned to a full-time simulcast of the FM station in March 1995, again as WDSY.

=== Gospel and Christian radio ===
In April 1997, WDSY was sold and changed formats to urban gospel as WPGR. In July 1999, the format moved to 1510.

Following two months of simulcasting, 1080 changed to a Christian radio format, using the WWNL call sign. Starting as a music-based station, WWNL has added more talk and paid programming in recent years, affiliated with the Wilkins Radio Network.

=== History of call letters ===
The call letters WWNL were previously assigned to an AM station in Newport, Kentucky. It initially broadcast on 1110 kHz but moved to 740 kHz in 1948.
