= Bob Trow =

American actor and radio celebrity (1926–1998)

Robert E. "Bob" Trow (February 6, 1926 – November 2, 1998) was an American radio celebrity, actor, and craftsman.

Trow starred as Bob Dog, Bob Troll, and himself on Mr. Rogers Neighborhood from 1968 to 1998. Trow died at his home in New Alexandria, Pennsylvania, in 1998, at the age of 72 of a heart attack. He had a wife and two sons.
