= Program-associated data =

Program Associated Data (PAD) or Program Service Data (PSD) is the data displayed on many HD Radio and satellite radio receivers. It can describe the program being transmitted and other information such as the name of the song, the artist and the genre of music. Using a feature known as “SlideShow”, it can also transport images that are displayed synchronized with the audio channel.

The HD radio and satellite systems provides a data path for this programming data to be delivered and read by the listener in near real time. HD radio and satellite radio receivers provide PAD decoders and visual screens for displaying the information.

PAD is different from Radio Data System (RDS) which is only used on analog stations.
