= Between Now and Then =

Between Now And Then

Compilation album by The Clarks
- Released: June 21, 2005
- Genre: Rock
- Length: 1:09:43
- Label: High Wire Music

The Clarks chronology
Fast Moving Cars (2004)	Between Now And Then (2005)	Still Live (2006)

Professional ratings
Review scores
Source	Rating
AllMusic	4/5 stars

Between Now and Then is the 2005 retrospective album by Pittsburgh band The Clarks. The interesting fact about this album is that it is a greatest hits compilation for a band that never achieved national prominence. However, this album allowed the band to combine all of their biggest songs with the intent of drawing in casual listeners. Fifteen of the band's hits were included in this collection, with the former singles "Boys Lie" and "Hell On Wheels" notably absent. Two new songs also were featured, including the upbeat single "Bona Fide." For this album, the band also did a rendition of the 1970s Badfinger classic "No Matter What."

== Track listing ==
1. "Bona Fide"
2. "Shimmy Low" (From: Fast Moving Cars [2004])
3. "On Saturday" (From: Another Happy Ending [2002])
4. "Hey You" (From: Another Happy Ending [2002])
5. "Let It Go" (From: Let It Go [2000])
6. "Better Off Without You" (From: Let It Go [2000])
7. "Born Too Late" (From: Let It Go [2000])
8. "Butterflies and Airplanes" (From: Let It Go [2000])
9. "Snowman" (From: Let It Go [2000])
10. "Apartment Song"
11. "Cigarette" (From: Live [2001])
12. "Mercury" (From: Someday Maybe [1996])
13. "Caroline" (From: Someday Maybe [1996])
14. "Treehouse" (From: Love Gone Sour, Suspicion, and Bad Debt [1994])
15. "Penny On the Floor (From: The Clarks [1991])
16. "Help Me Out" (From: I'll Tell You What Man... [1988])
17. "No Matter What" [Badfinger cover]
18. "Nothing's Wrong, Nothing's Right"

== Personnel ==
- Scott Blasey - lead vocals, acoustic & electric guitars
- Rob James - electric guitar, vocals
- Greg Joseph - bass guitar, vocals
- Dave Minarik - drums, vocals
