= Jim Quinn =

American talk radio host (1943–2025)

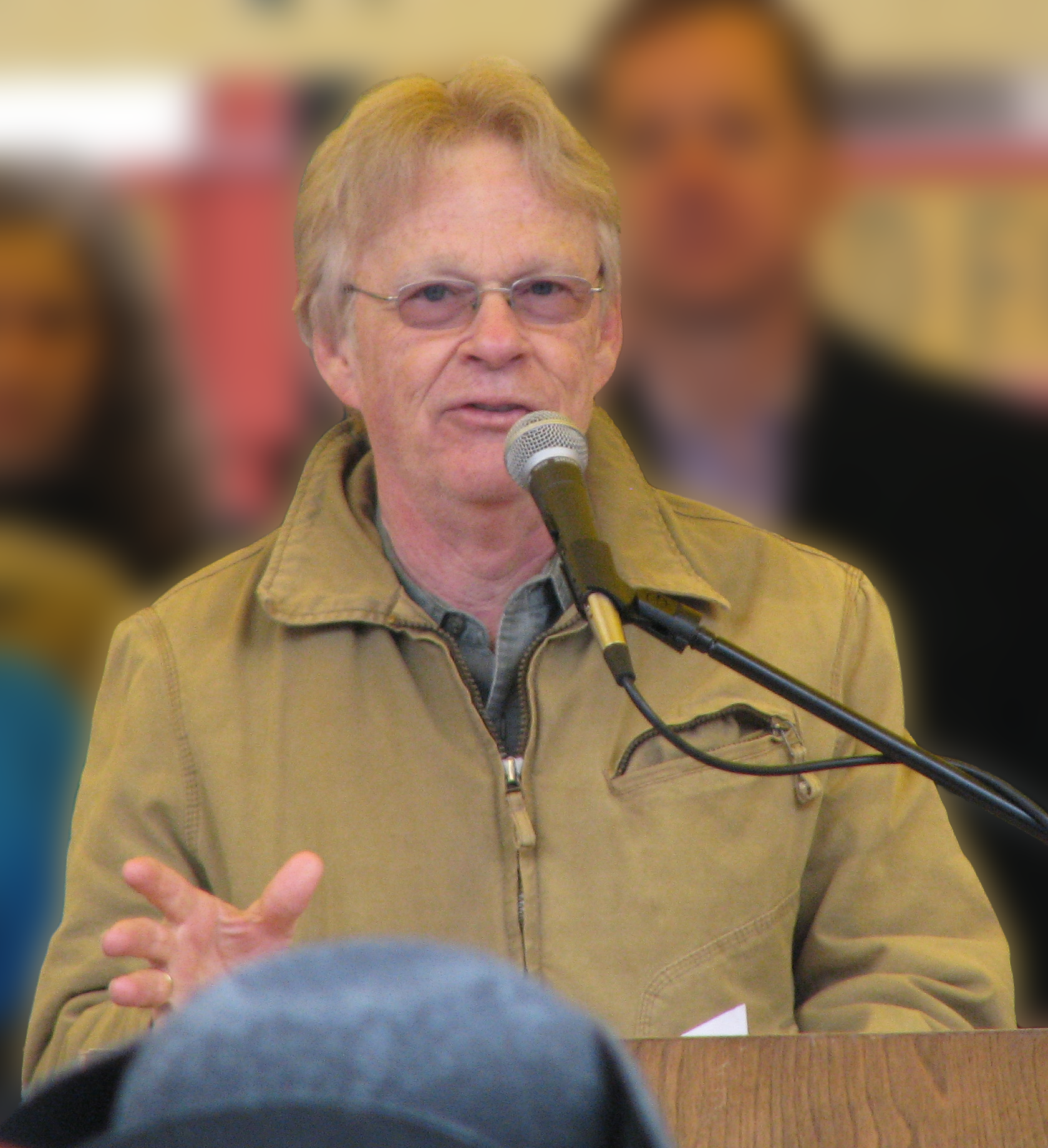
- Quinn at a Pittsburgh Tea Party protest in 2009
- Born: February 26, 1943; New Jersey, U.S.
- Died: March 29, 2025 (aged 82)
- Presenting career
- Show: Quinn in the Morning
- Stations: WYSL, WAVL
- Time slot: Weekdays, 6 a.m. to 9 a.m. EST
- Country: United States
- Previous show: The War Room with Quinn and Rose
- Website: www.warroom.com

Jim Quinn (February 26, 1943 – March 29, 2025) was an American conservative radio talk show host based in Pittsburgh, Pennsylvania, who hosted Quinn in the Morning on WYSL in Avon, New York, and WAVL in Apollo, Pennsylvania. Until its cancellation in November 2013, his program The War Room with Quinn and Rose was aired on 12 stations across the U.S. and was also heard on XM Satellite Radio Channel 244 from 6 a.m. to 9 a.m. Eastern Time, Monday through Friday.

== Disc jockey and novelty host ==
Before beginning his political morning show, Quinn spent a number of years at KQV in the 1960s and 1970s, where he befriended his eventual political mentor Rush Limbaugh. Limbaugh worked at KQV and at WIXZ in McKeesport, Pennsylvania, as a disc jockey under the name Jeff Christie.

Quinn was best remembered in the Pittsburgh area as the vociferous nighttime host on KQV radio in the 1960s, during the station's peak as a Top 40 power. Quinn was hired from WING/Dayton in 1967 and had an immediate impact on the market. In 1968, he jumped at an opportunity to take a job at WIBG Radio 99 in Philadelphia, but was back at KQV in less than a year. He stayed until 1972, then spent time in New York City at WPIX-FM.

He then moved to Buffalo, New York, where in the late 1970s, he became known to listeners throughout the northeast on WWKB (WKBW at the time), a 50,000-watt station that took requests from as far away as Norway. Quinn's final hour included a trivia game called "Stump The Audience", where the answers had been kept "in a sealed envelope on Funk and Wagnalls' doorstep since noon today". In an emotional farewell as he returned to Pittsburgh, Quinn said, "May I get lockjaw if I ever forget how much I appreciate the people who listen."

A Pittsburgh station, 13Q or WKTQ, lured him back in 1977 to capture the adults who had grown up listening to him on KQV. During his tenure at 13Q, Quinn issued a parody 45 rpm record of the then Top 40 hit "Undercover Angel" titled "Undercover Pothole"; the parody lamented the atrocious condition of Pittsburgh roads during that period. In 1979, Quinn moved to the midday slot at WTAE radio, an adult contemporary station in Pittsburgh, under the aegis of General Manager Ted Atkins ("Captain Showbiz"). In 1983, he became half of "The Quinn and Banana Show" alongside Don Jefferson on B-94 FM, which ran in Pittsburgh until 1992. Their format was bathroom humor. After a course of conduct wherein they implied that News Director Liz Randolph was promiscuous, she sued the station and Quinn and Banana for defamation and sexual harassment. On Valentine's Day 1990, Randolph won on all counts, and a jury awarded her $694,000. Three years later, his FM morning show was canceled. Quinn largely credits this lawsuit with inducing his conversion to political conservatism, saying "my formerly liberal eyes were opened to the agenda of the feminists, their friends and supporters in the media."

== Talk show host ==
After Quinn's program was canceled on B-94, he moved in 1993 to WRRK, where he gradually adopted his conservative political talk format. The program started in music format with Quinn as D.J., as Quinn in the Morning. But increasingly during breaks in music and during news reading he would editorialize. With the positive response he got from callers, and with increased ratings vs. the dominant FM radio The DVE Morning Show on WDVE (with Scott Paulson and Jim Krenn), the format eventually became entirely talk, focusing on conservative views of current events, and remained the only talk show on an otherwise music radio format. The program eventually moved to WPGB radio in 2004 when that station adopted an all-talk format that included conservative nationally syndicated shows like The Rush Limbaugh Show. Given the nature of his politics, the show was always locally controversial based on political affiliation. By 2008, Quinn's inflammatory language had earned him notoriety; for example, the Bill Moyers Journal on PBS noted he referred to the National Organization for Women as the "National Organization for Whores", which was often reported out of its full context, since Quinn would continue "...they're whores for liberal politics in general, and they were whores for Bill Clinton in particular." The Pittsburgh Post-Gazette reported that as of November 18, 2013, Quinn and his radio partner, Rose Somma Tennent, had been removed from the WPGB lineup.

Quinn was a proponent of a constitutional government that adheres to the guiding principles of the nation's founders. He championed a smaller federal government and free markets. He regularly equated modern Left Liberalism with Marxism. He commonly referred to "Quinn's Laws", a collection of statements that sum up his world view, such as "Liberalism always generates the exact opposite of its stated intent" (e.g., the War on Poverty has led to even greater poverty). He also had many personal views he was fond of voicing, such as "liberty is the solution to the human condition". In contrast to his co-host Rose, Quinn was not particularly religious for most of his life; he eventually became a practicing Christian in 2024.

The show, broadcast with co-host Rose Somma Tennent (also known as "Radio Rose"), aired live weekdays from 6 a.m. to 9 a.m. EST on certain affiliates and on XM Satellite Radio Channel 244; others replay the first hour after 9. It can be heard worldwide on the Internet via Warroom.com. Quinn's radio show abruptly ended in a contract dispute with Clear Channel radio in November 2013.

Quinn authored a so-called "liberal version" of The Ant and the Grasshopper in 1994.

After unsuccessfully negotiating to bring his show to WJAS in Pittsburgh (the station that picked up most of WPGB's lineup after a format change), Quinn agreed to resume his morning show on one of his former affiliates, WYSL, a station located outside of Rochester, New York. Quinn and WYSL owner Bob Savage had worked together in Pittsburgh.

== Death ==
Quinn died on March 29, 2025, at the age of 82. He had undergone open heart surgery in early February and suffered an aortic aneurysm, from which he never recovered.
