= The Clarks =

American rock band

- The Clarks performing at The Canon Theatre in 2026

Background information
- Origin: Indiana, Pennsylvania, U.S.
- Genre: Rock
- Years active: 1986–present
- Labels: Dahntahn (1988); Substitute (1991); King Mouse (1993–96); MCA (1996–97); Razor & Tie (2000–04); High Wire Music (2005–09); Clarkhouse Entertainment (2009–present)
- Members: Scott Blasey; Rob James; Greg Joseph; Dave Minarik
- Website: http://www.clarksonline.com/

The Clarks are an American rock band from the Pittsburgh region, originating at Indiana University of Pennsylvania. Over the course of forty-plus years, they have produced eleven studio albums, two live albums, 2 compilation albums, an EP, and four solo releases, selling near to a half-million copies.

== History ==
=== Formation and early years (1986–90) ===
Around 1985, singer Scott Blasey, guitarist Robert James Hertweck and drummer David Minarik, Jr. were all enrolled at Indiana University of Pennsylvania (IUP), located in Indiana, Pennsylvania, approximately 45 miles northeast of Pittsburgh. Hertweck and Minarik (along with a bass player and saxophonist) were putting together a new band, and through a mutual friend, recruited Blasey to be their lead vocalist. The band, calling themselves the Administration, primarily played cover versions of songs. After the Administration's sax player graduated and bass player transferred schools in the spring of 1986, Greg Joseph was brought in to round out the band. Settling on the quartet of Blasey, Hertweck, Joseph and Minarik, the group decided upon adopting a new name, effectively ending the Administration. They unceremoniously settled on the name "the Clarks." As the Administration had been, the Clarks were initially a cover band in their earliest months of existence. They covered artists such as the Replacements, the Rave-Ups and Hoodoo Gurus, as well as Joe Jackson and U2. However, they soon began writing their own material, helping them to take second place at the Tri-State Rock Competition in Pittsburgh.

In early 1988, with some of the band just finishing school at IUP and the rest graduated, the Clarks began recording their first album. Teaming up with producer Hank Lawhead, the band recorded at Aircraft Studios with free studio time won from their finish at the Tri-State Rock Competition. Titled I'll Tell You What Man..., the album was released by the local independent label Dahntahn Records with a release party at the Graffiti Showcase in the Pittsburgh neighborhood of Oakland. Initially only released on LP record and cassette tape, the vinyl copies of the album were warped when they were left in the delivery truck for too long. With the release date being too close to return them, the band sent them to the stores as-is. Despite this, the album sold modestly well in the Pittsburgh area. "Help Me Out" was released as a single and received airplay on 100.7 FM WXXP, helping to raise the band's profile in the area.

By the summer of 1988, with Blasey, Hertweck, Joseph and Minarik now all out of college, the band relocated from Indiana into Pittsburgh. The Clarks closed out the 1980s playing at bars, clubs and college functions around Western Pennsylvania, heavily touring to promote themselves.

=== Rising success (1991–99) ===
In 1991, the band began recording their second album. A self-titled release, the album came out on August 1, 1991 on the indie Substitute Records label. "Penny on the Floor," penned by Blasey, was released as the album's main single. Thanks to heavy airplay of "Penny on the Floor" on the popular radio station 102.5 WDVE and promotion on Scott Paulsen and Jim Krenn's DVE Morning Show, the band reached an even broader audience in the region. More than 5,000 copies of The Clarks were sold in the Pittsburgh area.

The four began recording a third album in 1993. To release the album, the band formed their own label, King Mouse Records. Initially scheduled to be released later that year, a delay in payment and a legal dispute with Aircraft Studios where the album was cut pushed the release back to June 30, 1994. Love Gone Sour, Suspicion, and Bad Debt begat the single "Cigarette," which (aside from the Clarks' home tri-state region of western Pennsylvania, northern West Virginia and eastern Ohio) saw airplay from radio stations across the Northeastern United States. The album sold 5,000 copies within three months and went on to sell nearly 17,000. With this release, guitarist Robert Hertweck began using the stage name "Rob James," derived from his first and middle names. On the heels of the success of "Cigarette," lead vocalist Scott Blasey released his first solo album, the acoustic Don't Try This at Home, on the band's King Mouse label in 1995.

The band's growing popularity did not go unnoticed by major label MCA Records, who inked the Clarks to a two-album deal in 1996. Working with Los Angeles producer Tim Bomba, the group recorded at the Club House studio in Germantown, New York—their first album to be produced away from Pittsburgh. MCA released Someday Maybe in the fall of 1996 with the intent of promoting "Stop!" and "Courtney" as the main singles. Unfortunately for the band, MCA instead decided to focus its energy in promoting Blink-182, neglecting to afford any substantial attention to the Clarks. To make matters worse, the label suffered financially in 1997 and as a result, MCA dropped many newly-signed artists, including the Clarks. The group, however, was not discouraged, as the album had again sold well in the Pittsburgh area and "Mercury" and "Caroline" were being played on the region's stations. Following the band's release from MCA, they re-released Someday Maybe (with different cover art) and I'll Tell You What Man… as King Mouse releases.

Despite the unfavorable experience with MCA, the Clarks moved forward. The band released their first live album, recorded at Nick's Fat City night club on Pittsburgh's South Side and aptly-titled Live, in 1998. Scott Blasey, in turn, released his second solo album, Shine, in 1999. The group continued to perform at packed shows throughout the Northeastern and Mid-Atlantic states, but did not immediately record a follow-up to Someday Maybe. However, they experienced a new chance at broader success with the arrival of the New Millennium. In late 1999, the band teamed with producer Justin Niebank, who had previously worked with Blues Traveler, Eric Clapton and John Hiatt, to begin work on a fifth studio album.

=== Niebank, Razor & Tie and height of touring (2000–07) ===
In partnering with the Clarks, producer Justin Niebank injected new energy into the band that had been left weary from dealing with MCA. He hired a national publicist to promote the band and secured a tour bus for them. Having a past as a musician, his opinions were valued when the band re-entered the studio after four years. Securing a record deal with the national Razor & Tie brand, the band began recording Let It Go at Hound's Ear Studio in Franklin, Tennessee, near Nashville. The album was released on June 20, 2000, and the band celebrated with a release party at Pittsburgh's I.C. Light Amphitheater, playing for over 4,500 fans.

Let It Go proved to be the Clarks' biggest success to date. Unlike MCA, Razor & Tie gave the band significant promotional support. The singles "Better Off Without You" and "Born Too Late" began receiving radio play from coast to coast, and "Snowman" and "Let It Go" also received airtime in Pittsburgh, Johnstown, Wheeling and Youngstown. "Let It Go" appeared in the 2001 Warner Bros. film, Summer Catch, and "Better Off Without You" appeared in the closing credits of E!'s Anna Nicole Show. The album climbed to number 21 on Billboard's Heatseekers Albums chart and went on to sell more than 25,000 copies. As a result of this success, the band began touring extensively around the country.

The group wasted no time in the aftermath of Let It Go. In 2001, the Clarks independently released an album of song outtakes recorded between 1997–2000 titled Strikes and Gutters on King Mouse Records. They then reunited with Niebank at Hound's Ear Studio to begin work on a sixth album. During rehearsals for recording, the September 11 attacks occurred. In response to the national tragedy, Scott Blasey penned "Hey You." Another Happy Ending was released on June 11, 2002, spawning the radio singles "Hey You," "On Saturday" and "Maybe." The album found its way to number two on the Heatseekers chart and 143 on the Billboard 200.

In 2003, the Clarks were contacted to record a song for Light of Day: A Tribute to Bruce Springsteen. The band chose "The River" as their contribution. Their cover of the song became a fan-favorite and remains in rotation on Pittsburgh radio. The recording reappeared on their own release, 2004's Strikes and Gutters 2: Doublewide outtake album.

The band worked once more with Niebank for 2004's Fast Moving Cars, again recording in Nashville. "Hell on Wheels," "Shimmy Low" and "Fast Moving Cars" were released as singles and the album settled at number 11 on the Heatseekers chart. In a career highlight, on August 31, 2004, the group performed "Hell on Wheels" on the Late Show with David Letterman on CBS. Fast Moving Cars was the band's final production with Niebank and the label. After the album's release, the Clarks departed Razor & Tie.

Shortly thereafter, the band joined with High Wire Music, releasing their first "best-of" compilation, Between Now and Then in 2005. This was followed in 2006 with their second live album and first live concert DVD, both titled Still Live and recorded at Mr. Small's Theatre in Millvale, Pennsylvania. Bassist Greg Joseph cut his first solo album, American Diary, in 2006 with Scott Blasey's third, Travelin' On, coming in 2007. The band effectively retired from the widespread national touring of the Razor & Tie years, mainly playing shows in the Pittsburgh region, as well as a healthy dose of concerts throughout the Northeastern, Mid-Atlantic and Midwestern United States.

=== Self-released projects (2008–present) ===
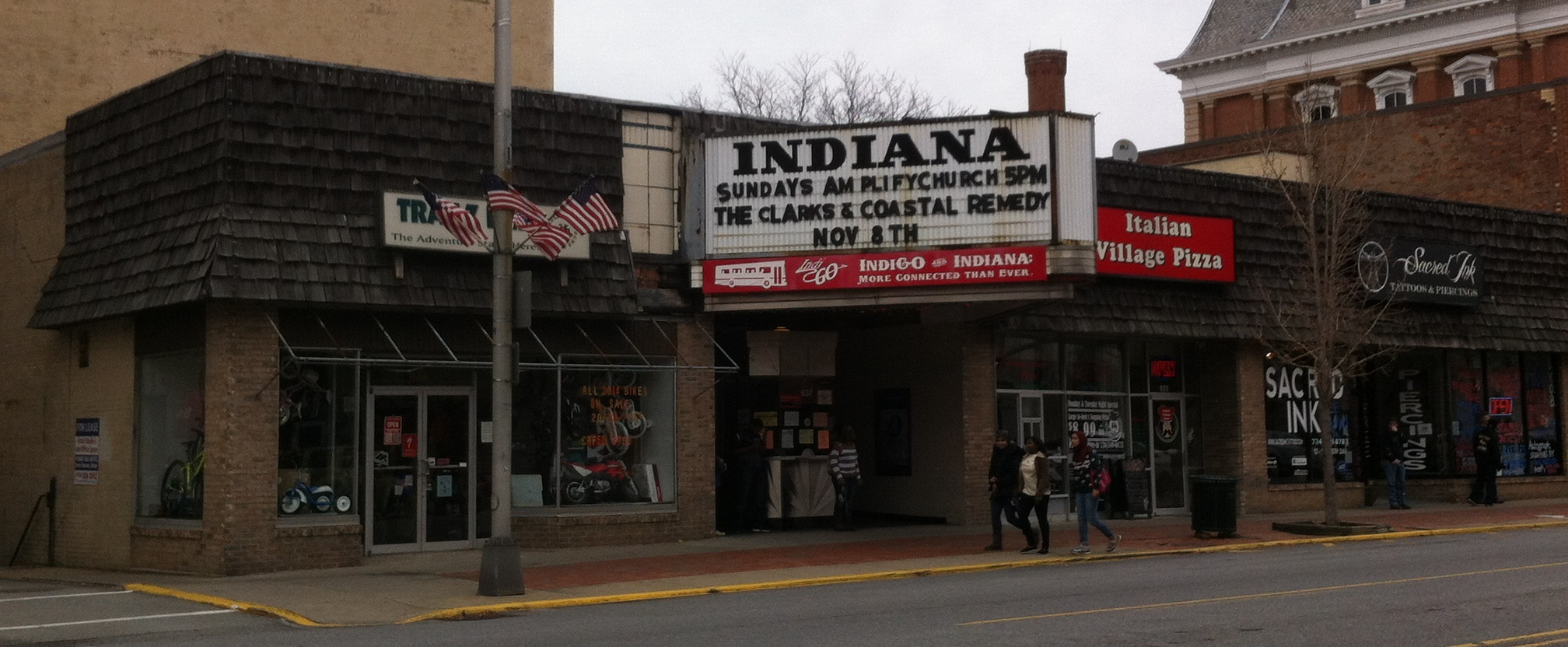
Marquee in Indiana, Pennsylvania for a Clarks concert, 2014

In 2008, the number of members in the band unofficially grew with the additions of keyboardist Skip Sanders and pedal steel guitarist Gary Jacob. On the forthcoming albums, Sanders and Jacob were credited only as "additional personnel;" however, the two also played live with the band on every concert date. Though Scott Blasey, Rob James, Greg Joseph and Dave Minarik remain the only official members of the band, the Clarks became a six-piece group with Sanders and Jacob.

Also in 2008, the Pittsburgh Penguins of the National Hockey League (NHL) commissioned the band to record a cover of Louis Armstrong's "What a Wonderful World" for promotional usage during the 2009 Stanley Cup playoffs. The Penguins won their third Stanley Cup championship that year, defeating the Detroit Red Wings four games to three. "What a Wonderful World" was included on the band's next studio album.

The Clarks' eighth studio album, Restless Days, was released on June 9, 2009 after a five-year gap without a studio album. The album was co-released by High Wire Music and Clarkhouse Entertainment, the band's newly-formed label to self-release their own projects. Restless Days most notably included "What a Wonderful World" and the radio singles "True Believer" and "Inside." The album was followed up with the band's first EP, the digitally-released-only Songs in G on November 9, 2010. The EP featured re-recordings of five Clarks classics, plus a rendition of Whiskeytown's "16 Days".

On December 29, 2010, the band played their 2,000th career show at Pittsburgh's newly-opened Stage AE on the North Shore. In honor of the occasion, December 29 was declared "The Clarks Day" by the City of Pittsburgh. Days later, on January 1, 2011, the group performed during the first intermission of the 2011 NHL Winter Classic at Heinz Field between the Penguins and the Washington Capitals. The visiting Capitals won the game 3–1. Additionally in 2011, the Clarks recorded a commercial jingle for Toyota titled "Life is All About the Ride."

In early 2013, the Clarks announced they were beginning work on their ninth studio album. To help fund production of the album, the band invited their fans to contribute to a crowdfunding campaign on PledgeMusic. The campaign succeeded beyond their expectations, achieving 317% of their desired goal. The group reunited with producer Sean McDonald, whom they had worked with on Restless Days, at Red Medicine Recording in Swissvale, Pennsylvania. Feathers & Bones was released on July 8, 2014 and was the band's first album to be solely released via Clarkhouse Entertainment. The album spawned the regional radio singles "Take Care of You" and "Irene." The album also counted among its recording personnel Noah Minarik, son of drummer Dave Minarik. Following the release of the album, the younger Minarik began regular touring with the band, playing guitar as an unofficial touring member.

Less than a year after recording Feathers & Bones, the Clarks returned to Red Medicine Recording with McDonald to begin work on another new album, again to be produced in part by donations from PledgeMusic. The new album featured covers of songs by bands they had been inspired by and covered during their early days at Indiana University of Pennsylvania. Their tenth studio album, Rewind, was released on June 9, 2015.

The band's eleventh studio album and tenth of originally-composed material, Madly in Love at the End of the World, was released on June 8, 2018. Among its eleven tracks was the Blasey-penned "In Blood," a response to American school shootings. Aside from being released to streaming media and on compact disc, the album was also released on vinyl, the first Clarks album so released since their 1988 debut.

== Members ==
Current members

- Scott Blasey - lead and background vocals, electric & acoustic guitars (1986–present)
- Rob James - electric & acoustic guitars, mandolin, background vocals (1986–present)
- Greg Joseph - bass guitar, background vocals (1986–present)
- Dave Minarik - drums, background vocals, (1986–present)

Unofficial/touring members

- Gary Jacob - pedal steel, acoustic guitar (2008–present)
- Skip Sanders - keyboards (2008–present)
- Noah Minarik - guitar (2014–2025)
- Mikey O'Toole - guitar (2025–present)

== Discography ==
=== Studio albums ===
Year	Title	Label
1988	I'll Tell You What Man...	Dahntahn
1991	The Clarks	Substitute
1994	Love Gone Sour, Suspicion, and Bad Debt	King Mouse
1996	Someday Maybe	MCA
2000	Let It Go	Razor & Tie
2002	Another Happy Ending	Razor & Tie
2004	Fast Moving Cars	Razor & Tie
2009	Restless Days	High Wire Music
2014	Feathers & Bones	Clarkhouse Entertainment
2015	Rewind	Clarkhouse Entertainment
2018	Madly in Love at the End of the World	Clarkhouse Entertainment

=== Outtake albums ===
- Strikes and Gutters, 2001 (Razor & Tie)
- Strikes and Gutters 2: Doublewide, 2004 (Razor & Tie)

=== Live albums ===
- Live, 1998 (King Mouse)
- Still Live, 2006 (High Wire Music)

Live at Yeadonfest, Wexford, PA 1996 (Bootleg)

=== Compilation album ===
- Between Now and Then, 2005 (High Wire Music)
- Between Now and Then Vol. 2, 2019 (Clarkhouse Entertainment)

=== EPs ===
- Songs in G, 2010 (digital release only)
- Echoes from the Pitt, 2026

The Unimart EP. Out of print 1997

=== Videography ===
- Still Live, 2006

=== Solo albums ===
==== Scott Blasey ====
- Don't Try This At Home, 1995
- Shine, 1999
- Travelin' On, 2007
- Three The Hard Way, 2024

==== Greg Joseph ====
- American Diary, 2006
