= Charlie Baumann =

American football player (born 1967)

No. 6, 7, 8, 12
- Position: Placekicker

Personal information
- Born: August 25, 1967 (age 59); Erie, Pennsylvania, U.S.
- Listed height: 6 ft 1 in (1.85 m)
- Listed weight: 203 lb (92 kg)

Career information
- High school: Cathedral Prep (Erie)
- College: West Virginia
- NFL draft: 1989: undrafted

Career history
- Buffalo Bills (1989); Minnesota Vikings (1989)*; Seattle Seahawks (1990)*; Orlando Thunder (1991); Miami Dolphins (1991); New England Patriots (1991–1992); New York Jets (1994)*; Pittsburgh Steelers (1994)*; Baltimore Stallions (1994); Orlando Predators (1996–1997)
- * Offseason or practice squad member only

Career NFL statistics
- Field goals made: 20
- Field goal attempts: 29
- Field goal %: 69
- Longest field goal: 48
- Stats at Pro Football Reference

Bruce Charles Baumann (born August 25, 1967) is an American former professional football player who was a placekicker in the National Football League (NFL) and the Arena Football League (AFL). He played college football for the West Virginia Mountaineers and was acquired through free agency in 1991 by the Miami Dolphins. He was signed by the New England Patriots where he played two seasons.

He is the older brother of Randy Baumann, host of The DVE Morning Show on Pittsburgh's WDVE, and Bryan Baumann, who was a kicker at West Virginia.

== Education ==
Bachelor of Arts, Communication Studies, West Virginia University 1990; Master of Business Administration (Finance), University of Central Florida 1997; Master of Science in Accounting, University of Central Florida 2004.

== Post-football career ==
Chief Financial Officer, U.S. Medical Group of Florida, Inc.; Vice President, 1405 S. Orange Partnership LLP;
