= Feathers & Bones =

Studio album by The Clarks
- Released: July 8, 2014
- Recorded: 2013–2014; Red Medicine Recording Studio; Swissvale, PA
- Genre: Rock
- Length: 35:38
- Label: Clarkhouse Entertainment
- Producer: Sean McDonald

The Clarks chronology
Songs in G (2010)	Feathers & Bones (2014)	Rewind (2015)

Feathers & Bones is the ninth studio album by Pittsburgh-native band, the Clarks. Released on July 8, 2014, the album marked their first studio effort in five years, since 2009's Restless Days. Additionally, it was the band's first release of any kind in four years, following 2010's downloadable-only EP Songs in G. Feathers & Bones was first announced in early 2013, and soon thereafter, the Clarks began a PledgeMusic campaign to help fund the album's production. The campaign succeeded beyond the band's expectations, achieving 317% of their desired goal. Upon the album's release, the song "Take Care of You" received steady airplay on Pittsburgh-region radio stations, such as WDVE.

== Track listing ==
1. "Feathers & Bones" (Joseph)
2. "All or Nothing" (James/Blasey)
3. "Nothing Good Happens After Midnight" (Joseph)
4. "Irene" (Blasey)
5. "Take Care of You" (Blasey)
6. "Map of the Stars" (Joseph/McDonald/Williams)
7. "Nothing But You" (Joseph/James)
8. "Magazine" (Joseph/Hanner)
9. "Some Call it Destiny" (Blasey)
10. "Take Me" (James/McDonald)
11. "Broken Dove" (Blasey/James/McDonald)

== Personnel ==
- Scott Blasey - lead vocals, acoustic guitar
- Rob James - electric and acoustic guitars, mandolin, vocals
- Greg Joseph - bass, acoustic guitar, vocals
- Dave Minarik - drums, vocals
- Gary W. Jacob - pedal steel
- Skip Sanders - keyboards, accordion
- Joy Brown - vocals
- Bernice Wilkerson - vocals
- Noah Minarik - vocals on "Broken Dove"
