= Songs in G =

EP by The Clarks
- Released: November 9, 2010
- Genre: Rock
- Length: 23:31

The Clarks chronology
Restless Days (2009)	Songs in G (2010)	Feathers & Bones (2014)

Songs in G is the first EP by the Clarks, released in 2010. It was only released digitally, and it remains that way as of 2013. Aside from the first track (a cover of a Whiskeytown song), the tracks are re-imaginations of older Clarks material.

== Track listing ==
1. "16 Days"
2. "Tonight"
3. "Penny on the Floor"
4. "Snowman"
5. "Boys Lie" feat. Maddie Georgi
6. "Shimmy Low"

== Personnel ==
- Scott Blasey, lead vocals
- Rob James, guitar and backing vocals
- Greg Joseph, bass and backing vocals
- Dave Minarik, drums
- Maddie Georgi, vocals ("Boys Lie")
