= Strikes and Gutters 2: Doublewide =

Studio album by The Clarks
- Released: March 23, 2004
- Genre: Rock
- Length: 62:28
- Label: Razor & Tie

The Clarks chronology
Another Happy Ending (2002)	Strikes and Gutters 2: Doublewide (2004)	Fast Moving Cars (2004)

Strikes and Gutters 2: Doublewide, released in 2004, is an album by Pittsburgh rock band The Clarks, their second outtake album.

== Track listing ==
1. "Queen of America"
2. "Rise and Fall"
3. "Save Me"
4. "Upside Down"
5. "Old Friend"
6. "The Ship is Going Down"
7. "The River"
8. "I'm a Fool"
9. "Snowman"
10. "The Truth Will Set You Free"
11. "Brand New"
12. "What's Going On"
13. "Cigarette" (No Smoking Mix)
14. "Holiday Season"

The CD also contained a purposefully hidden track that came after "Holiday Season" and was a parody of Dr. Seuss with lyrics about recreational drug use.

== Personnel ==
- Scott Blasey - lead vocals, electric & acoustic guitars
- Rob James - electric & acoustic guitars, vocals, Vocal turn on "Holiday Season"
- Greg Joseph - bass guitar, vocals, Lead Vocals on "Queen of America" and "Holiday Season"
- Dave Minarik - drums, vocals, Vocal turn on "Holiday Season"
