= Madly in Love at the End of the World =

Studio album by The Clarks
- Released: June 8, 2018
- Recorded: Nov. 2017–Feb. 2018; The Church Recording Studio; Pittsburgh, PA
- Genre: Alternative country Rock
- Label: Clarkhouse Entertainment
- Producer: Dave Hidek; The Clarks

The Clarks chronology
| Rewind (2015) | Madly in Love at the End of the World (2018) |

Madly in Love at the End of the World is the eleventh studio album (tenth of original material) by Pittsburgh-based band the Clarks, released on June 8, 2018. Aside from being released to streaming media and on compact disc, the album was additionally released on vinyl, the band's first to be released as such since their debut release I'll Tell You What Man... thirty years prior.

== Track listing ==
1. "She's on Fire" (Joseph)
2. "The Longest One Night Stand" (Joseph)
3. "Witness to a Crime" (Joseph)
4. "Roses" (Joseph)
5. "What Do You Do" (Joseph)
6. "Dying to Live" (Joseph)
7. "In Blood" (Blasey)
8. "Keep Your Eyes on the Road" (Blasey)
9. "Dance on the Bar" (Blasey)
10. "Summer Setting Sun" (Blasey)
11. "Madly in Love at the End of the World" (Blasey)

== Personnel ==
- Scott Blasey (lead vocals, acoustic guitar)
- Rob James (6- and 12-string electric guitars, acoustic guitar, vocals)
- Greg Joseph (bass, 12-string acoustic guitar, vocals (Lead Vocal on "She's on Fire")
- Dave Minarik (drums, vocals)
- Gary Jacob (pedal steel, 12-string electric guitar)
- Skip Sanders (piano, organ, electric guitar, mandolin)
- Noah Minarik (6- and 12-string electric guitars)
- Simon Cummings (cello on "Madly in Love at the End of the World")
- Kayla Schureman (vocals on "Roses" and "Dying to Live")
