= Live (The Clarks album) =

Live album by The Clarks
- Released: 1998
- Recorded: September 18–19, 1998; Nick's Fat City, Pittsburgh, PA
- Genre: Rock
- Label: King Mouse Records

The Clarks chronology
Someday Maybe (1996)	Live (1998)	Let It Go (2000)

Live is the first live album by Pittsburgh rock band the Clarks, released in 1998.

== Track listing ==
1. "Mercury"
2. "Brand New"
3. "Over Me"
4. "Now and Then"
5. "Penny on the Floor"
6. "If I Can't Have You"
7. "Courtney"
8. "Help Me Out"
9. "Apartment Song"
10. "Lock and Key"
11. "Caroline"
12. "Cigarette"
13. "Kiss"
14. "Last Call"

== Personnel ==
- Scott Blasey - lead vocals, electric & acoustic guitars
- Rob James - electric & acoustic guitars, vocals
- Greg Joseph - bass guitar, vocals
- Dave Minarik - drums, vocals
