= Strikes and Gutters =

Studio album by The Clarks
- Released: February 19, 2001
- Genre: Rock
- Length: 48:25
- Label: Razor & Tie

The Clarks chronology
Let It Go (2000)	Strikes and Gutters (2001)	Another Happy Ending (2002)

Strikes and Gutters is an album by Pittsburgh rock band The Clarks, their first outtake album. It was released in 2001.

== Track listing ==
1. "Roses and Diesel"
2. "Talk of the Town"
3. "The Deal"
4. "Lock & Key"
5. "Apartment Song"
6. "Does Your Harbour Light Still Shine?"
7. "Little Sanctuary"
8. "Over Me"
9. "Reves Arabesque"
10. "Mother's Only Son"
11. "Tonite"
12. "The Blizzard"
13. "Give Me Tonight"

== Personnel ==
- Scott Blasey - lead vocals, electric & acoustic guitars
- Rob James - electric & acoustic guitars, vocals
- Greg Joseph - bass guitar, vocals
- Dave Minarik - drums, vocals
