= Rewind (The Clarks album) =

Studio album by The Clarks
- Released: June 9, 2015
- Recorded: Spring 2015; Red Medicine Recording Studio; Swissvale, PA
- Genre: Rock
- Label: Clarkhouse Entertainment
- Producer: Sean McDonald

The Clarks chronology
| Feathers & Bones (2014) | Rewind (2015) | Madly in Love at the End of the World (2018) |

Rewind is the tenth studio album by Pittsburgh-native band the Clarks. The album, released June 9, 2015, came less than one year after the band's previous studio release, Feathers & Bones. Like its predecessor, Rewind was produced partially by crowdfunding on PledgeMusic. However, unlike any of the band's previous efforts, the album contains only covers of other bands' songs. The bands covered on the album heavily influenced the Clarks when they were founded at Indiana University of Pennsylvania in 1986, and many of the songs were played live during their initial years as a cover band.

== Track listing ==
1. "Like Wow – Wipeout!" (Hoodoo Gurus) (Faulkner)
2. "I Want You Bad" (The Long Ryders) (Adams, Crandon)
3. "A Million Miles Away" (The Plimsouls) (Alkes, Case, Fradkin)
4. "By the Way" (The Rave-Ups) (Podrasky)
5. "I Will Dare" (The Replacements) (Westerberg)
6. "Begin the Begin" (R.E.M.) (Berry, Buck, Mills, Stipe)
7. "Mybabyshe'sallright" (Scruffy The Cat) (Chesterman)
8. "Blood and Roses" (The Smithereens) (DiNizio)
9. "White Lies" (Jason & the Scorchers) (Baggs, Napier)
10. "Paint It Black" (The Rolling Stones) (Jagger, Richards)
11. "Long White Cadillac" (Dwight Yoakam) (Alvin)

== Personnel ==
- Scott Blasey - lead vocals, acoustic guitar
- Rob James - 6- and 12-string electric guitars, acoustic guitar, harmonica, organ, vocals
- Greg Joseph - bass
- Dave Minarik - drums, vocals
- Noah Minarik - electric guitar ("I Will Dare")
