= Still Live =

Still Live may refer to:

- Still Live (The Clarks album), 2006
- Still Live (Keith Jarrett album), 1986
