= Let It Go (The Clarks album) =

Studio album by The Clarks
- Released: June 20, 2000
- Genre: Rock
- Length: 47:18
- Label: Razor & Tie
- Producer: Justin Niebank

The Clarks chronology
Live (1998)	Let It Go (2000)	Strikes and Gutters (2001)

Professional ratings
Review scores
Source	Rating
AllMusic	4/5 stars
Rolling Stone	5/5 stars

Let It Go is the fifth studio album by Pittsburgh band The Clarks, released on June 20, 2000. The album outsold many major national releases in the Pittsburgh area and generated huge local radio hits. The release was the band's first on Razor & Tie, the New York-based minor rock label. Let It Go has been critically acclaimed, despite being unknown to rock fans in most parts of the country. However, the success of the album's singles in the Pittsburgh market led to their spread to audiences in nearby Cleveland and Central Pennsylvania.

"Let It Go" actually made several national appearances, although it did not bolster the song's national popularity. It appeared in the 2001 Warner Bros. film Summer Catch. "Better Off Without You" was played during the closing credits of each episode of The Anna Nicole Show on the E! Network.

The track "Born Too Late" originally appeared on frontman Scott Blasey's 1999 solo album, Shine, but was then reworked by the entire band for its appearance on this album.

== Personnel ==
- Scott Blasey – lead and background vocals, rhythm guitar
- Rob James – lead guitar, electric sitar, background vocals
- Greg Joseph – bass, background vocals, lead vocal on "Butterflies and Airplanes"
- Dave Minarik – drums, percussion, background vocals

== Track listing ==
1. "Snowman"* – 4:18
2. "I'm a Fool" – 3:52
3. "Better Off Without You"** – 4:36
4. "Born Too Late" – 3:17
5. "Let It Go" – 3:24
6. "Chasin' Girls" – 3:50
7. "Flame" – 4:46
8. "Butterflies and Airplanes"* – 3:47
9. "Think of England"* – 3:42
10. "Highwire" – 3:04
11. "The Letter" – 4:36
12. "If Memory Serves" – 4:06

Music and Lyrics by Scott Blasey, except "Snowman", "Butterflies and Airplanes", and "Think of England" by Greg Joseph, and "Better Off Without You," Music by Rob James, Lyrics by Scott Blasey (Verses and Bridge) and Rob James (Chorus).
