= Eddy Crow =

American sports media personality

Eddy Crow is an American sports media personality based in Pittsburgh, Pennsylvania.

Crow worked at Pittsburgh's ESPN Radio 1250 from 2004 to 2010. He was also sportscaster on The DVE Morning Show on WDVE until 2002. Crow's former shows on 1250 were titled The Drive and Junker and Crow.

As of February 2010 Eddy Crow was unemployed after being let go by ESPN Radio. Now he hosts talk shows on Friday and Saturday evenings for KDKA-AM radio. He also fills in for other KDKA hosts. He is also doing fill-in work at WBVP/Beaver Falls and WMBA/Ambridge in Beaver County.

== Personal ==
He has a keen interest in bass fishing, and has contributed to the Bassmasters Classic. He has a daughter named Allison and is divorced.
