= Bill Crawford (comedian) =

American comedian

- Born: November 9, 1979 (age 46); Pittsburgh, Pennsylvania, United States
- Notable work: Member of The DVE Morning Show

Comedy career
- Years active: early 2000s-present
- Website: http://billcrawfordlive.com

Bill Crawford is a comedian and radio personality, best known for his work on The DVE Morning Show on WDVE in Pittsburgh, Pennsylvania from January 2012 to December 2025.

== Career ==
Crawford began doing standup in his native Pittsburgh in the early 2000s. In 2004, he was "discovered" by then-DVE Morning Show host Jim Krenn, who invited him to become a regular guest on the show. As a result, he became a bigger name in Pittsburgh and began touring with big-name comedians. In January 2012, he joined the DVE Morning Show as a full-time member along with former host Scott Paulsen in light of Krenn's dispute with WDVE parent Clear Channel Communications and his dismissal from the show and station. Crawford and Paulsen joined Morning Show stalwarts Randy Baumann, Val Porter and Mike Prisuta. He left the DVE Morning Show in December 2025 to focus on his stand-up comedy career.

== See also ==
- Scott Paulsen
- Jim Krenn
- Randy Baumann
