= Still Live (The Clarks album) =

Live album by The Clarks
- Released: June 20, 2006
- Genre: Rock
- Label: High Wire Music

The Clarks chronology
Between Now and Then (2005)	Still Live (2006)	Restless Days (2009)

Professional ratings
Review scores
Source	Rating
Allmusic	3.5/5 stars

Still Live is the second live album by Pittsburgh rock band The Clarks, released in 2006. It was released both as a live CD and as a concert DVD.

== CD track listing ==
1. "Better Off Without You"
2. "You Know Everything"
3. "Bona Fide"
4. "Maybe"
5. "Rise and Fall"
6. "The Letter"
7. "On Saturday"
8. "Hey You"
9. "Shimmy Low"
10. "Fast Moving Cars"
11. "Nothing's Wrong Nothing's Right"
12. "Boys Lie"
13. "Hell On Wheels"
14. "Butterflies and Airplanes"
15. "Let It Go"
16. "Gypsy Lounge"

== DVD track listing ==
1. "Better Off Without You"
2. "You Know Everything"
3. "Help Me Out"
4. "Bona Fide"
5. "Maybe"
6. "Rise and Fall"
7. "On Saturday"
8. "Hey You"
9. "Shimmy Low"
10. "Born Too Late"
11. "Boys Lie"
12. "Hell On Wheels"
13. "Penny On the Floor"
14. "Butterflies and Airplanes"
15. "Train"
16. "Let It Go"
17. "Gypsy Lounge"
18. "Cigarette"

== Personnel ==
- Scott Blasey - lead vocals, electric & acoustic guitars
- Rob James - electric & acoustic guitars, vocals
- Greg Joseph - bass guitar
- Dave Minarik - drums, vocals
