= Cris Winter =

American radio DJ

Cris Winter is an American radio personality on Pittsburgh, Pennsylvania's WDVE radio station. For six years she provided the voice of "Thundergirl" on the Nicktoons animated series Action League Now!. Winter was one of two original disc jockeys at WXXP 100.7, Pittsburgh's first alternative radio station from 1986 to 1988. She was the host of the local music show on WXXP, being the first to play bands like The Clarks, Affordable Floors, Sponges, Eleventh Hour, Spuds, and other local musicians. In August 1988 WXXP changed formats and Winter was fired. In 2020, after 14 years in the 5:30-10am shift, she was dismissed from WISH, moving to previous employer WDVE in 2022.
