= Tarsha Vega =

- Born: April 26, 1972 (age 53); The Bronx, New York, United States
- Genres: Pop, Contemporary R&B
- Label: RCA Records

Tarsha Vega (born April 26, 1972) is an American recording artist, occasional actress, and internet personality. She is best known for her 2000 debut album Diamonds and Monsters (on RCA Records).

== Career ==
Vega provided vocals for the Pop Rox album The Warriors, with Duke Mushroom and the FreshMaka, the duo responsible for remixes like Sisqo's "Thong Song" and DMX's "Party Up". Then Vega released her debut album in 2000, Diamonds and Monsters. Vega co-wrote each of the songs. Vega takes on topics including self-esteem and child molestation. Music icon Carole King helped with the songwriting and provided backup vocals on "Rooftops". Other titles on the album include "Goodbye Girl" and "Be Ya Self" plus "Shine On." "Be Ya Self" is a girl-empowering anthem; "Diamonds and Monsters" is a song about abuse.

The "monsters" in the title refer to the animals from the classic children's book, Where the Wild Things Are ("I think of them as really fun as opposed to scary," says Tarsha) and the "diamonds" are a metaphor for her own character. "Diamonds are very, very hard-although they're beautiful," she explained. "I have this kind of hard shell, but at the same time my mother managed to round me out into having a beautiful mind, spirit and soul."

"Be Ya Self" is featured on the soundtrack for the hybrid animated/live-action movie, The Adventures of Rocky and Bullwinkle. Tarsha was featured as writer and performer on the Summer Catch soundtrack with the song, "What It Beez Like". Vega collaborated with rapper Chubb Rock on the song "The Freshest" off the soundtrack for the film Thirteen starring Holly Hunter.

As of 2011, Vega was serving as Executive Producer and Host for "theKNU", an Internet-based radio show on GVBradio.com. She appeared in the films Get A Grip and Fugitive Hunter.

== Personal life ==
Vega was born in The Bronx, New York, the only child of a single mother who worked for the New York City Department of Education. She said of her mom, "My mom and I are more like sisters." Is of mixed African-American and Dominican blood.
