= List of Action League Now! episodes =

Action League Now! is a stop motion children's television series that was originally part of All That and then KaBlam! on Nickelodeon, and was later spun off into its own show. A total of 51 episodes have aired, with an average time of five minutes each.

== Shorts ==
=== All That (1995) ===
No.	Title	Original release date
0a	"I've Been Workin' on Derailroad"	October 14, 1995
The Action League are given the task of going undercover and finding out what (or who) is responsible for a number of train wrecks that have been occurring at the railroad. (First appearances of the Action League and The Mayor.)
0b	"Stinky on Ice"	October 28, 1995
Stinky Diver, after saving a young child from a bowl of hard, sticky liquid (presumably Jell-O), gets stuck within the substance after it starts to harden. Will the rest of the Action League be able to save him in time, or will Stinky remain motionless forever and become history?

== Episodes ==
=== Season 1 (1996) ===
No.	Title	Original release date
1	"Nightmare on Memory Lane"	October 7, 1996
Meltman loses his memory after a life-size phone lands on him during a mission to steal a secret formula from The Mayor's office. The Action League—with help from Bill the Lab Guy—must try their best to bring him back to his previous state. (First appearance of Bill the Lab Guy.)
2	"Thunder and Lightning"	October 14, 1996
There's a new superheroine in town, and her name is Lightning Lady! She wastes no time in getting herself inducted into the Action League and garnering much (male) attention, leaving Thundergirl jealous. Is everything about Lightning Lady crystal clear, or is there more to this mysterious "woman" than once thought?
3	"The Wrath of Spotzilla"	October 21, 1996
Loud clog-dancing by Meltman (in midst of a celebration to honor the Action League) goes wrong when it wakes up Spotzilla, a Mesozoic creature that runs rampant upon awakening. After it eats up Stinky Diver during a televised interview, the League realize that they must act fast to rescue one of their own. (Part 1 in first appearance of Spotzilla.)
4	"Sinkhole of Doom"	October 28, 1996
The Mayor's son gets stuck in a kitchen sink during an exploration, and it is up to the Action League to save him. However, the League's ineptitude at such tasks proves to be an obstacle, with Thundergirl and Stinky Diver spending much of the episode stuck to an active ceiling fan. Can they rescue the victim before time runs out?
5	"No Fly Zone"	November 4, 1996
A mysterious liquid is squirted onto Thundergirl by The Mayor in a sabotage attempt, resulting in her losing the ability to fly. Once the Action League find out that he has two children kidnapped in a birdhouse, only the power of flight can save them, so the League gets to work—using balloons and a slingshot, among other devices, to try to get Thundergirl airborne.
6	"RoboFlesh"	November 11, 1996
The Mayor kidnaps The Flesh and unleashes his newest weapon, RoboFlesh: a robot designed to look exactly like his namesake, except for bolts sticking out of his entire body. RoboFlesh goes into attack mode on the Action League, who are having a parade, until the actual Flesh comes to the rescue. The only downside is that the League cannot differentiate between the two!
7	"Stink or Swim"	November 18, 1996
After a failed attempt at saving a victim from a flushing toilet, Stinky Diver goes on a downward spiral. The Action League must work together to bring back to courage he once had. In the end, Stinky will have to overcome his fear of long-distance diving, but only in order to retrieve his wallet, which is in the hands of a drowning Meltman. (First appearance of Stench Diver.)
8	"Where Pigeons Dare"	November 25, 1996
Upon the death of Helena XXII, Queen of the Pigeons, the Action League are given the task of keeping the four eggs she's left behind safe until they hatch. After accidentally breaking one of them, The Chief makes the League responsible for a 24-hour surveillance of the remaining batch. Will there be any offspring left by the end of the episode? (Guest appearance by the snake.)
9	"The Wrath of Spotzilla: Part 2"	December 2, 1996
The episode starts off where the first half stopped, with The Flesh swinging a leash and attaching it to the collar of a running Spotzilla, unable to stop him after a short, rough-and-tumble trip. Will Stinky Diver remain within the realms of Spotzilla's massive stomach for good, or can the Action League come through before digestion occurs? (Part 2 in second appearance of Spotzilla.)
10	"Testimony of Terror"	December 9, 1996
The Action League are given the task of protecting a young child from The Mayor for an upcoming testimonial. However, things take an ugly turn when the child turns out to be a complete nuisance, physically injuring and disposing of the League in a number of ways. Once he has gotten them out of his way, The Mayor goes on the offensive with a surprise.
11	"Dog Day Afterschool"	December 16, 1996
A rocket that is being prepared for takeoff contains The Chief's beloved dog, Justice, within its realms, a plan executed by none other than The Mayor (as revenge against Justice for peeing in his hot tub). Can Thundergirl's flying ability and Meltman—who has been thrown onto the rocket via The Flesh's strength—be able to save the plastic pooch?
12	"Road to Ruin"	December 23, 1996
The Mayor is driving through town, littering just about everywhere, and it's up to the Action League to chase him down and stop him from continuing his heinous ways! Can the League (in their Action Mobile) overcome The Mayor (in his much, much bigger automobile) before the entire town gets covered in trash?
13	"In the Belly of the Beast"	December 30, 1996
The Mayor interrupts The Chief, in the middle of a date on the mountains, by sucking him up inside a gigantic vacuum cleaner. Not long afterwards, the rest of the Action League get trapped inside the structure, as well, and the only person who can save them is Meltman—who was made fun of by the League only seconds before!

=== Season 2 (1997) ===
No.	Title	Original release date
14	"Danger Society"	March 10, 1997
There's a new group of superheroes in town, and they're called the Danger Society! After saving The Chief at an annual company picnic, they begin to take over every task that the Action League used to fail at. Before long, the Society replaces the League completely, leaving them out of work. In the end, the only way to decide who gets to stay in town is by seeing which team can save a bus full of schoolchildren first.
15	"Flesh and Blood"	March 17, 1997
After reuniting with his long-lost "parents" on popular television program Lola, The Flesh is asked by them to carry heavy objects from an empty building into their car. At first, the Action League are jealous of the airtime Flesh is getting, but they soon discover that he has been lied to and needs to be stopped.
16	"Turkey of Terror"	March 24, 1997
The Mayor invites the Action League to his home for a Thanksgiving dinner, and Stinky Diver is the only one to think twice about the situation. After Justice lets Stinky know of the League's situation, it's up to him to save his colleagues from escaping the inside of a hollowed-out turkey in the midst being cooked in an oven. (First appearances of Stinky Diver's mother and father; second appearance of Stench Diver.)
17	"Science Fiction Parody"	March 31, 1997
Peaceful aliens land on Earth and ask to learn about the way Earthlings function. Unfortunately for them, the Action League are assigned as Earth's representatives. As expected, just about everything goes wrong (aliens getting melted, electrocuted, and liquefied, among other things), and the extraterrestrials soon change their minds about giving peace a chance.
18	"The Quarky Syndrome"	April 7, 1997
Illegal nuclear activities by The Mayor place Quarky the Lab Girl in danger, as she gets infected and later gains superpowers from the effects. Thus, Super Teen is born! Will the Action League be able to get things in order, or is it up to the father-daughter team of Quarky and Bill the Lab Guy to solve the problem at hand? (First appearance of Quarky the Lab Girl.)
19	"Meltman at Large"	April 14, 1997
After drinking an unfinished chemical in Bill the Lab Guy's laboratory, Meltman suddenly turns into a giant. Changing his name to Mega Meltman, he soon finds out that his large stature is making things harder for himself and the rest of the Action League to cope with. However, in the end, this increase in size may help out a group of young kids who are trapped on top of a large tree. Near the end of the episode, Bill the Lab Guy wanted to tell Meltman that the drug was temporary. However, Meltman refused to listen and he shrunk, causing him to fly away.
20	"Revenge of Hodge Podge"	April 21, 1997
A number of suspicious packages are sent to the Action Headquarters, and once they're opened, they combine to form Hodge Podge, the former accountant for the Action League who was disfigured and put back together (poorly) after a blender accident. This maniacal madman is out for revenge, and nobody can stop him! (First appearance of Hodge Podge.)
21	"Incident at Chlorine Lake"	April 28, 1997
A local swimming pool run by The Mayor seems to be causing some trouble lately. Once the Action League get to the scene to investigate, they find that a large trophy bass thought to be extinct is the cause of it all, chomping down swimmers and dismembering them. Bill the Lab Guy warns the League of the rarity and elegance of the sea creature, but Stinky Diver has other plans in mind.
22	"Caged Thunder"	May 5, 1997
Thundergirl, while secretly taking photos of The Mayor's illegal weaponry, is captured and placed in a cage. It's up to the rest of the Action League to rescue her, but, per usual, they screw up, ending up in the cage along with her. After a dumb bet placed by Meltman, The Mayor proceeds to press a button that sets off a rocket scheduled to blow up the capital.
23	"Rock-A-Big Baby"	May 12, 1997
During a Kiss concert that Meltman and Thundergirl are attending, the noise caused by the band awakens a gigantic baby wearing nothing but a diaper. Big Baby, as it's known, enters the concert scene and runs rampant, eventually gnawing on the band members due to its teething. Can Meltman, who earlier claimed to be personal friends with Kiss, do something to stop it? (First appearance of Big Baby. Guest voices done by the members of Kiss. This episode was shown in theaters before Good Burger.)
24	"Voice of Treason"	May 19, 1997
Hodge Podge is back, and this time, he distracts Bill the Lab Guy long enough to steal a voice box from his possession. First disguising his voice as The Chief's and giving the Action League the day off, Hodge Podge begins calling each member individually thereafter, using the device to disguise himself and trick the League into falling victim to his various traps. Can they be saved before a massive garage door crushes them all?
25	"Danger for a Dignitary"	May 26, 1997
A foreign ambassador visits the Action League, but ends up dismembered in a matter of seconds due to The Flesh's foolishness. When the League realizes how much he and Flesh look alike, they disguise and send Flesh to the desired destination: a worldwide meeting of representatives. Can Flesh keep his clothes on long enough for the event to be over with, or will his instincts kick in before the chance arrives?
26	"Big Baby"	June 2, 1997
The Mayor exploits Big Baby for his own personal gain at a carnival, but it manages to escape, causing terror throughout the town. This time, it sets its sights on Quarky, Bill the Lab Guy's daughter, climbing a coat hanger a la King Kong. Can the Action League fix this "smelly" situation before something happens to Quarky's well-being? (Second appearance of Big Baby, later appearance in Big Baby series; final appearance of Quarky the Lab Girl.)

=== Season 3 (1998) ===
No.	Title	Original release date
27	"Flippers of Fury"	August 30, 1998
Stinky Diver arrives at the Action Headquarters to discover that all of his property has been messed with, the perpetrator behind these actions turning out to be someone known as the Red Ninja (much thanks to a ninja star that finds its way into Meltman's back). The Red Ninja, a rival of Stinky's from years ago, has come back for revenge, and the only way Stinky can defeat him once more is by visiting his old sensei, Master Pu, to gather forgotten tips.
28	"Rags to Riches"	September 6, 1998
An opal stolen by The Mayor from a mummy's tomb causes a curse to be unleashed, resurrecting the ancient mummy. It runs rampant around town—even managing to out-strength the Action League—in search for his stolen treasure, which The Mayor happens to be selling on the Home Shopping Network. Will the League manage to return the mummy's opal to its rightful place and reverse the curse?
29	"Fatter"	November 15, 1998
An arrested gypsy places a curse on The Chief upon being labeled as a fake at a carnival. Soon after, he begins an odd and unhealthy eating habit, chewing down just about everything around him, and his weight begins increasing at an alarming rate. The gypsy is asked to reverse the curse, but is accidentally crushed to death moments later. Will overeating mark the end of The Chief?
30	"Hey! Who Stole My Face?"	September 20, 1998
Upon confronting The Mayor in the midst of his latest treachery, The Flesh causes both he and The Chief to take part in a blender accident. Once Bill the Lab Guy gets done with the operation, everything seems to be back to normal—except the fact that The Chief and Mayor's faces have been switched! Being the dullards that they are, the Action League begin taking orders from The Mayor, while The Chief is imprisoned. Could things get any worse?!
31	"Mad Dogs and Englishmen"	September 27, 1998
Stinky Diver, depressed over the fact that his own mother tried ratting him out for a sum of money during the Gulf War, makes friends with an estranged dog, whom he names Smelly. Stinky and Smelly become the best of friends, but the hound makes a habit of injuring the rest of the Action League. Is Smelly just a playful pooch, or is there more to this issue than originally thought? (Second appearance of Stinky Diver's mother.)
32	"Melty Dearest"	October 4, 1998
Confusing a rare and deadly South American jumping spider egg with a ping pong ball, Meltman witnesses the spider's hatching, and decides to act as a maternal figure for the arachnid. The spider begins to cause harm to the Action League, but Meltman is not ready to give up the fight against keeping it so easily. In the end, it's up to the spider's mother to confront Meltman and get her offspring back. (Action figure versions of Arnold Schwarzenegger and Sylvester Stallone appear in this episode, though they do not voice themselves.)
33	"Melty's Girl"	October 11, 1998
Meltman finds himself a girlfriend, Andrea, who quickly begins to become a nuisance to the rest of the Action League due to her pushing ways and being allowed into secret territory by Meltman. After noticing how badly Meltman is treated by the League, she motivates Meltman into becoming a solo superhero known as Dr. Melt. Is Meltman's girlfriend trying to drive him away from the people who care about him the most, or is she just a pure soul trying to do good?
34	"Tears of a Clone"	October 18, 1998
Bill the Lab Guy invents a cloning device (a.k.a. copyer) and warns the Action League to never use it. As they step onto the device and look at their reflection, The Mayor gets involved, pressing the cloning machine's lid down. As The Mayor steals and tries getting away with some incredibly breakable fine China, the League (and two clones of each member) must try making amends with their respective counterparts long enough to stop him.
35	"Art of Thunder"	October 25, 1998
The Action League are assigned to protect a very important painting during a night shift. However, they get distracted while making fun of a drawing by Thundergirl, and The Mayor steals the painting, taking it to his lair. Can the League retrieve this original Timmy painting before The Mayor destroys it with a paper shredder?
36	"Roughing the Passer"	November 1, 1998
The Mayor is not being allowed into the National Football League as a quarterback, being told that there are already too many. So he begins to get rid of the NFL's most valuable quarterbacks, one by one, as the Action League are assigned to protect them—much to the misfortune of the players. Will the entire QB section be destroyed just so The Mayor can get in the game? (Special appearances by Troy Aikman, John Elway, Brett Favre, Kordell Stewart, and Bill Cowher as action figures, voicing themselves.)
37	"Hit of Horror"	November 8, 1998
Hodge Podge is back with a plan: this time, he has formed his own radio station to play a song designed to play mind games with its listeners, causing them to form a hatred for and a desire to destroy the Action League. Everywhere they go, the League gets attacked by the dozen, and only an old friend of Bill the Lab Guy's can save them! (Special appearance by Lou Rawls in action figure form, playing a modified version of "You'll Never Find Another Love Like Mine".)
38	"A Star is Torn"	November 14, 1998
The Mayor, disguised as a movie director, offers Thundergirl the lead role in his upcoming project. However, every scene involving her ends with an injury in one way or another. Meltman soon finds out the director's true identity, but the rest of the Action League are too busy with their yet-to-come fame to care. Will the final scene—involving a massive safe landing on top of Thundergirl—be the final blow for her?

=== Season 4 (1999–2000) ===
No.	Title	Original release date
39	"Yurplastic Park"	November 20, 1999
The Action League visit Bill the Lab Guy at his latest expedition: resurrecting million-year-old dinosaurs and releasing them in their natural habitat, his life's work (which also includes selling expensive coffee mugs). Stinky Diver believes that they must be destroyed for our own good, but Bill naturally disagrees. Soon after, all of them are devoured by a massive carnivore, and it's up to The Chief, who is miles away on a dock, with an official assigned to destroy the dinosaur-infested island with missiles—to stop them from imminent death.
40	"Winds of Evil"	November 27, 1999
The Mayor's latest creation is a giant fan that gusts wind at incredible speeds, destroying just about everything in its path. One by one, members of the Action League begin to lose their homes, their last hope being bunking with Stinky Diver to protect them from the winds. Unfortunately for them, an earlier disregard of a party held by Stinky (taking place in his home, which is a toilet) leaves the superhero with an unforgiving attitude.
41	"Chickie Chickie Bang Bang"	December 4, 1999
Thousands of hungry chicks are being kept gated by The Mayor in his latest attempt at becoming rich from selling them. But when the chicks break through and run amuck, even attacking The Mayor, the League must think fast and transport them to a location where they will stay away from things to devour.
42	"The Naked and the Dumb"	December 11, 1999
The Action League are forced to take an exam to see if they can remain in the group, and The Flesh is the only one to fail, being forced to turn his badge in. As the League pleads with Bill the Lab Guy for Flesh to retake the exam, they begin trying to teach him, but all plans go awry. Can Flesh, with no knowledge whatsoever in his empty skull, pass the retake?
43	"What's Eating The Flesh"	December 18, 1999
Riding a diseased Guinea pig results in The Flesh contracting a disease that dismembers its carriers in a short amount of time. Flesh's limbs begin to fall off, and—even with their best efforts—the rest of the Action League contract the disease soon after. Can Bill the Lab Guy find a cure in enough time for Flesh to help The Chief caddy for his upcoming golf game? Trivia: When Bill the Lab Guy examines The Flesh, when he looks at the microscope, the "micro organisms" seen is actually a game of Pac-Man which must have been taken from the Namco Museum series (due to the original Puck-man bezel).
44	"Tune Up of Terror"	December 25, 1999
Hodge Podge gets a hold of the Action Mobile and modifies up so that he can control it with a large remote control. This causes Meltman, who has just gotten his driver's license, to be berated by the Action League for his terrible driving. But once The Chief takes the driver's seat, the League begins realizing that it may not have, in fact, been Meltman who was controlling the vehicle so badly. (Final appearance of Hodge Podge. His last lines were "Why don't these things work on big cars?! Darn it. Aaaahhh...!!!" before getting hit and he screams as he flies to pieces... for good this time.)
45	"Armageddon Outta Here"	December 31, 1999
A giant meteor is coming towards Earth, and only the Action League can stop it! They begin taking proper training to be sent to space with explosive that can deteriorate the meteor. Of course, in true Action League Now! fashion, they discover that they have left the explosives behind once the shuttle takes off.
46	"A Flesh of Brilliance"	January 8, 2000
Information stored in The Flesh's brain (in order to keep it away from a new villain known as Smarty Pants) results in him gaining immense intellectuality. But as soon as the transportation takes place, the Action League realize how much they dislike the new, smart Flesh. Once Smarty Pants successfully gets his hands on the League and holds them hostage, it's up to Flesh to rescue them, and only winning a game of chess will do the job for his opponent.
47	"Grief for The Chief"	January 15, 2000
A rather dramatic accident — executed by the idiotic Flesh — forces The Chief into the hospital with a coma. As Bill the Lab Guy tries his best to recover the beloved, outspoken Chief, the Action League begin to reminisce about their favorite times spent with their boss in the waiting room. Can the big guy pull through and wake up from his coma, or will the League be without its beloved leader?
48	"In the Whine of Fire"	January 18, 2000
Meltman is given the task of being a bodyguard to pop sensation Blandi after being too afraid of the conditions around him to save a musician known as Johnny Cool. Starting to think that the Action League is trying to make him more courageous by attacking him and Blandi with a gigantic robot (in reality, The Mayor's doing in order to make his album, The Eviltones, a success), Meltman finds a new love interest after Blandi declares him her hero (after the robot's battery dies). Will Meltman muster up the courage to tell her off, or will Mayor's second, larger robot be the end of them both? (This was the first two-part episode in Action League Now! history to air on a single block. Final appearances of The Mayor and Bill the Lab Guy. In both portions of the episode, Blandi was voiced by singer Robyn.)
49	"And Justice for None"	January 22, 2000
The Action League must convince an entire courtroom of their actions in the past to avoid termination. One by one, they step up and talk about why they deserve to remain a unit, only to be shut down by a previous instance being brought up (with many flashbacks, old and new, used as examples for both). In the end, it's up to The Flesh to do the convincing, and if he cannot pull together a solid excuse, the League is done for! (Final appearances of The Flesh, Thundergirl, Stinky Diver, Meltman and The Chief. This should officially be recognized as the last-ever Action League Now! episode.)

== Episodes (2001–2002) ==
This is a list of the Action League Now! episodes that aired as a whole series. These 30-minute blocks contained four shorts per airing, with activities such as "Behind the Plastic", "Ask the League?" and "Action IQ" placed in-between. The episode titles signified the subject matter of the shorts that were going to be seen (for example, "Action League Rocks!" contained four shorts that all had to do with music). Not all shorts were put into episodes.

As mentioned before, a majority of these shorts were previously seen on KaBlam!, and only two in total were brand new.

- Action League Goes to the Movies (Armageddon Outta Here / Incident at Chlorine Lake / Yurplastic Park / A Star is Torn) (November 25, 2001)
- Smash Hits (Road to Ruin / Nightmare on Memory Lane / Roughing the Passer / And Justice for None) (December 2, 2001)
- Science Friction (Tears of a Clone / What's Eating The Flesh / The Quarky Syndrome / Science Fiction Parody) (December 9, 2001)
- Action League Rocks! (Rock-A-Big Baby / Hit of Horror / In the Whine of Fire) (December 16, 2001)
- Stinky Diver: Behind the Mask (Flippers of Fury / Mad Dogs and Englishmen / Stink or Swim / Winds of Evil) (December 23, 2001)
- The Chief: Look Back in Anger (Hey! Who Stole My Face? / Fatter / Grief for The Chief / Dog Day Afterschool) (December 30, 2001)
- I'll Melt for You (Meltman at Large / Melty's Girl / Tune Up of Terror / In the Belly of the Beast) (January 6, 2002)
- Monster Mashed (Melty Dearest / Rags to Riches / Wrath of Spotzilla) (January 13, 2002)
- The Many Faces of Evil (Revenge of Hodge Podge / A Flesh of Brilliance / Big Baby / Voice of Treason) (January 20, 2002)
- His Dishonor (Turkey of Terror / Chickie Chickie Bang Bang / No Fly Zone / Testimony of Terror) (January 27, 2002)
- Naked Came the Numskull (The Naked and the Dumb / Danger for a Dignitary / Flesh and Blood / RoboFlesh) (February 3, 2002)
- Thunder Girl: Tracking The Storm (Thunder and Lightning / Caged Thunder/ Art of Thunder/ Sinkhole of Doom) (Series Finale) (February 10, 2002)
