= Summer Catch =

2001 film by Michael Tollin

- Theatrical release poster
- Directed by: Michael Tollin
- Screenplay by: Kevin Falls; John Gatins
- Story by: Kevin Falls
- Produced by: Michael Tollin; Brian Robbins; Sam Weisman
- Starring: Freddie Prinze Jr.; Jessica Biel; Fred Ward; Jason Gedrick; Brittany Murphy; Gabriel Mann; Bruce Davison; Matthew Lillard; Brian Dennehy
- Cinematography: Tim Suhrstedt
- Edited by: Harvey Rosenstock
- Music by: George Fenton; Tarsha Vega
- Production company: Tollin/Robbins Productions
- Distributed by: Warner Bros. Pictures
- Release date: August 24, 2001
- Running time: 108 minutes
- Country: United States
- Language: English
- Budget: $17-34 million
- Box office: $19.7 million

Summer Catch is a 2001 American romantic comedy film directed by Michael Tollin and starring Freddie Prinze Jr., Jessica Biel and Matthew Lillard. The film marked Tollin's feature film directorial debut. The setting is the Cape Cod Baseball League, but the majority of the film was shot in Southport, North Carolina. The film was released on August 31, 2001 by Warner Bros. Pictures and grossed $19.7 million against a $17–34 million budget while receiving mostly negative reviews.

== Plot ==
Ryan Dunne is a local baseball player who dreams of playing in the Major Leagues. He helps his dad with his landscaping business and takes care of Veteran's Field, where his team, the Chatham A's play.

Ryan, in his dedication to making the pros, has sworn off girls and drinking to avoid distractions. This changes when he sees Tenley Parrish, as he and his father are mowing the Parrish family's lawn.

The next day, the A's have their first game of the season where rival Van Leemer shines pitching a shut-out, while Ryan is told to walk the stands for donations. That evening Ryan and Tenley have their first kiss.

The next night Ryan is pitching in his first game of the season. The game goes well for the A's until the last inning when he gives up a grand slam, allowing the other team to win the game. He returns home to find his dad drunk and upset about the loss.

Later, Ryan visits Tenley, where he confides about his rocky relationship with his father and fear of failing as a baseball player. The next night, they take a swim in her pool in the rain, falling in love, before being chased off by her dad.

Ryan is distracted by Tenley and feels a lot of pressure from scouts, family, the Parrish family, and friends. Told he's starting for an upcoming big game, Ryan starts well, but comes apart later on. The loss causes him to be demoted to the bullpen in a relief position. Despite the bad outing, Hugh Alexander, a scout for the Philadelphia Phillies in attendance, shows interest in Ryan.

Eric Van Leemer and Dale Robin are kicked off the team not only for their bad behavior, but also for accidentally burning down a press box, so Ryan is designated to start the final game, as he has the freshest arm and the most rest.

Tenley tells Ryan that she's leaving for San Francisco for a job the following night, also the night of the final game. She tells him to let himself be great, before tearfully hugging him goodbye.

Inspired by Tenley's words of encouragement, Ryan pitches one of the best performances ever seen in the Cape League, dominating the game with a no-hitter. His friends, dad and brother, and several major league scouts, including Alexander, are in attendance. Late in the game, he notices that Tenley has stopped by on her way to the airport to watch him. He proceeds to strike out the current batter, marking his eleventh strike-out of the game, and looks back to see that Tenley has gone.

Ryan rushes to the airport where he catches Tenley before she boards her plane. They both profess their love for each other and she agrees to forgo her job in San Francisco and stay. Ryan's dad and brother soon arrive with the scout Alexander, to tell him that his team won the game with a combined no-hitter. Alexander offers Ryan a contract with the Phillies that will start him out at their minor league affiliate, which he happily accepts.

Later, everyone is gathered to watch Ryan in his Major League debut as a relief pitcher for the Phillies. He delivers his first pitch to Ken Griffey Jr., who launches it into the stands for a home run.

== Cast ==
- Freddie Prinze Jr. as Ryan Dunne
- Jessica Biel as Tenley Parrish
- Fred Ward as Sean Dunne, Ryan's father
- Matthew Lillard as Billy Brubaker
- Brian Dennehy as Coach John Schiffner
- Jason Gedrick as Mike Dunne, Ryan's older brother
- Brittany Murphy as Dede Mulligan
- Gabriel Mann as Auggie Mulligan
- Bruce Davison as Rand Parrish, Tenley's father
- Marc Blucas as Miles Dalrymple
- Wilmer Valderrama as Mickey Dominguez
- Christian Kane as Dale Robin
- Corey Pearson as Eric Van Leemer
- Zena Grey as Katie Parrish, Tenley's younger sister
- Jed Robert Rhein as Pete
- Traci Dinwiddie as Lauren
- Susan Gardner as Marjorie
- John C. McGinley as Hugh Alexander (uncredited)
- Beverly D'Angelo as Lusty House Mother (uncredited)

Phillies players Mike Lieberthal, Doug Glanville, and Pat Burrell, along with outfielder Ken Griffey Jr., make appearances at the end of the film. Other notable cameos in the movie include Kevin Youkilis, Curt Gowdy, Hank Aaron and Carlton Fisk.

== Production ==
The film was not filmed in New England because the spring season was too cold so the actual production site was in Southport, North Carolina. The Chatham A's baseball field that was used in the film was actually built from a field that had been abandoned for about 20 years. Within about eight weeks the field was complete with batting cages and a press box ready to film. Since the filming of the movie, the field has once again been abandoned and is simply an overgrown field. The majority of the people cast for the roles of the teammates were actual minor-league baseball players. Only seven of the 35 people cast for the roles of the teammates were actors. The baseball players had to attend a four-week training camp during which they learned how to ignore the cameras on the field and to feel and act more as a team. All of the actors had to practice every day.

Prinze was reportedly paid $2 million for his performance.

== Reception ==
=== Critical response ===
On Rotten Tomatoes, the film holds an approval rating of 8% based on 91 reviews, with an average rating of 3.4/10. The website's critics' consensus reads: "A clichéd and predictable sports comedy that's mostly devoid of excitement or laughs, Summer Catch is strictly bush-league." On Metacritic, the film has a weighted average score of 21 out of 100 based on reviews from 25 critics, indicating "generally unfavorable reviews". Audiences polled by CinemaScore gave the film an average grade of "B+" on an A+ to F scale.

Lawrence Van Gelder of The New York Times wrote that it was "figuratively and literally a minor league movie." He opened his critique by stating, "Take the romantic impulse behind F. Scott Fitzgerald's story Winter Dreams. Add some New England small-town social stratification from John P. Marquand's novel Point of No Return. Add a pinch of lusty Apple Annies from Bull Durham and some townie-preppy animosity from Good Will Hunting. Then bury the whole thing under a mound of standard-issue parent-child conflicts and enough self-help clichés to drive Polonius to the aquavit barrel at Elsinore. Sprinkle with half-baked characters and a predictably odds-defying outcome, and the result is Summer Catch."

Joe Leydon of Variety was more forgiving with his analysis, but explained, "With its haphazard mix of boisterously crude comedy, romantic entanglements, class-conscious clashes and intensely competitive hardball, pic plays like it was inspired by a late-night channel surf through Major League, Bull Durham, One Crazy Summer and some late-’50s wrong-side-of-the-tracks meller." He praised George Fenton’s score and the film's humor, singling out Matthew Lillard, Brittany Murphy and Beverly D'Angelo.

Marc Savlov of The Austin Chronicle gave the movie one and a half stars out of five, adding, "Baseball, summer, apple pie, and Freddie Prinze Jr.'s bare butt – what could be more American? Toss in a brief glance at Matthew Lillard's equally nekkid behind and you've got a better-late-than-never entry in the clichéd teen love-story genre that, while generally inoffensive, is nonetheless so cloyingly heartfelt that it's all you can do not to giggle every time someone makes a prophetic, lovestruck proclamation (of which there are many)."

=== Box office ===
The film opened at #6 at the U.S. box office raking in $7 million in its opening weekend. Summer Catch went on to gross $19 million worldwide, failing to bring back its $34 million budget.

=== Home media ===
Summer Catch was released on VHS and DVD on December 4, 2001.

== Soundtrack ==
- Sweet Summer - Radford
- Jump (The Velvet Rope) - Clara Star a.k.a. Seven and the Sun
- Would You...? - Touch and Go
- Straight To... Number One - Touch and Go
- Bohemian Like You - The Dandy Warhols
- Soul Sound - Sugababes
- Let It Go - The Clarks
- Mr. Hawkins - Uncle Kracker
- Another Day - Nine Days
- Anything and Everything - Youngstown
- Everytime She Walks - Fastball
- I Like It - The Miami Allstars
- Going Back to Cali - Rick Rubin and LL Cool J
- Over My Head - Semisonic
- Makes No Difference - Sum 41
- The Whole Enchilada - Brett Laurence
- Wild Blue Night - Trina Harmon, Dillon O'Brian, and Matthew Gerrard
- Skin - Collective Soul
- Tell Her This - Diffuser
- What It Beez Like - Tarsha Vega
- Sometimes - Michael Franti and Spearhead
- Lovin' Each Day - Ronan Keating

== See also ==
- List of baseball films
