= Randy Baumann =

American comedian

- Born: Randall Baumann; 10 January 1972 (age 54); Erie, Pennsylvania, U.S.
- Education: Pennsylvania State University
- Occupations: Radio personality, comedian, musician
- Years active: 1990s–present
- Website: www.dve.com/pages/randy-baumann.html

Randy Baumann is a radio personality, best known for his work as host of Randy Baumann and the DVE Morning Show on WDVE in Pittsburgh, Pennsylvania, USA. From 2000 to 2011, he co-hosted the show with Jim Krenn as Jim Krenn, Randy Baumann and the DVE Morning Show until Krenn left WDVE in December 2011.

Before joining the DVE Morning Show in 2000, Baumann was an announcer for Rocket 101, WRKT in Erie, Pennsylvania, using the on-air name "Buckethead". Baumann's brother, Charlie Baumann, was a kicker at West Virginia University and for the New England Patriots.

== See also ==
- Scott Paulsen
- Jim Krenn
- Bill Crawford
