= The DVE Morning Show =

- Other names: Scott Paulsen and the DVE Morning Show (1986-1988); Scott Paulsen, Jim Krenn and the DVE Morning Show (1988-1999); Jim Krenn and the DVE Morning Show (2000); Jim Krenn, Randy Baumann and the DVE Morning Show (2000-2011); Randy Baumann and the DVE Morning Show (2012-present)
- Genre: Comedy, Talk, Rock
- Running time: 6:00 am-10:00 am (4 hours)
- Country of origin: United States
- Home station: 102.5 WDVE
- Starring: Randy Baumann; Mike Prisuta; Abby Krizner
- Original release: 1986 – present
- Website: http://www.dve.com/pages/randy-baumann.html
- Podcast: http://www.dve.com/cc-common/podcast.html

The DVE Morning Show (currently branded Randy Baumann and the DVE Morning Show) is a morning radio comedy and variety show broadcast on Pittsburgh classic rock station 102.5 FM WDVE featuring DJ Randy Baumann. The show began airing in the 6:00-10:00 am weekday morning drive slot in late 1986 after the cancellation of Jimmy and Steve in the Morning (from which the show draws inspiration). Originally hosted by Scott Paulsen, the show would go on to be hosted by the team of Paulsen and Jim Krenn from 1988 to 1999, briefly by Krenn solo, then by the team of Krenn and Baumann from 2000 to 2011. Since late December 2012, Baumann has hosted with comedian Bill Crawford and sportscaster Mike Prisuta with news anchor Val Porter departing the show in January 2024 and Bill Crawford leaving in December 2025. Additionally, many other newsreaders, sportscasters and other members have come and gone during the show's run.

Over nearly forty years, the DVE Morning Show has remained one of the popular morning radio programs in the Pittsburgh market. Although the show has undergone several personnel changes, it has maintained a consistent format that includes comedy segments, celebrity impersonations, telephone interviews, in-studio guests, unusual news items, sports coverage, and promotion of local music and comedy.

== History ==
In 1980, WDVE began airing Jimmy and Steve in the Morning with DJs and hosts Jimmy Roach and Steve Hansen. Roach and Hansen re-established comedy and local music promotion on Pittsburgh morning radio, elements that had been absent from the region's airwaves for quite some time. They helped to promote the careers of Pittsburgh area acts like the Iron City Houserockers, the Granati Brothers, Donnie Iris and the Cruisers and B. E. Taylor Group. This formula of comedy, talk and local music helped to make the show and station extremely popular in the region. Despite this, WDVE did not renew their contracts in 1986, and Roach and Hansen were fired, effectively canceling Jimmy and Steve in the Morning.

Not long after Roach and Hansen's departure from WDVE, the station replaced them and their show. Hiring comedian/DJ Scott Paulsen, the station began airing Scott Paulsen and the DVE Morning Show in the 6:00-10:00 am time slot. Adopting a similar format to Roach and Hansen, Paulsen's show became very popular and kept WDVE near the top of the ratings. In 1988, Paulsen was teamed up with comedian Jim Krenn, who had been a regular on the show. Paulsen and Krenn even competed against Roach and Hansen from 1987 to 1991, when the latter duo joined WMYG. When Jimmy Roach and Steve Hansen went separate ways in 1991, Scott Paulsen, Jim Krenn and the DVE Morning Show became Pittsburgh's most popular morning radio program.

Over the next decade, Paulsen and Krenn created many comedic characters, sketches and celebrity impersonations. They interviewed many regular guests and continued to promote Pittsburgh music and comedy. At the end of 1999, Scott Paulsen decided to not renew his contract and leave WDVE and the Morning Show (he would return later in 2000 until 2006 as a DJ). For a temporary period of time in 2000, Krenn hosted solo and the show was rebranded Jim Krenn and the DVE Morning Show. After interviewing several candidates, Krenn and WDVE selected Erie, Pennsylvania native and radio personality Randy Baumann. The program was again rebranded, this time Jim Krenn, Randy Baumann and the DVE Morning Show, and the show remained popular in the ratings.

Over the show's run, several newsreaders and sportscasters have come and gone. However, newsreader Val Porter and sportscaster Mike Prisuta have been with the show since the early 2000s. Phil Kirzyc, later the DJ for the weekday 7:00 pm–12:00 am time slot, got his start at WDVE as the Morning Show's announcer.

For a period of a month in January and February 2010, Randy Baumann did not appear with Jim Krenn on the program because of a contract dispute, and the show was temporarily rebranded The DVE Morning Show. Negotiations were eventually settled, and Baumann returned to Jim Krenn, Randy Baumann and the DVE Morning Show.

In December 2011 and January 2012, a member of the Morning Show again went through a contract dispute. This time, it was Jim Krenn's turn. WDVE wanted Krenn to leave the Morning Show and become the station's spokesperson, as well as become more of an internet personality. Krenn wanted to remain in his current position as host of the program. As a result of this, Jim Krenn was forced to leave WDVE and the Morning Show after twenty-five years on the air. Because of a non-compete clause in his contract, Krenn has not yet returned to Pittsburgh's airwaves. He has since returned to focus on his standup while also hosting an internet podcast, Jim Krenn: No Restrictions, which began streaming in March 2013. Krenn would eventually return to Pittsburgh radio, albeit on a weekly basis, joining Larry Richert and John Shumway on Fridays from 8:00-9:00 am on KDKA-AM.

During Krenn's dispute with WDVE and parent company Clear Channel Communications, the program returned to the air from its holiday break with Baumann, Val Porter and Mike Prisuta, again retitled The DVE Morning Show. In January 2012, it was announced that Scott Paulsen would return to the show as an "executive contributor" as well as a fill-in host/DJ. Comedian Bill Crawford was also hired to join the show. When Paulsen and Crawford joined the show later that month, the show was rebranded Randy Baumann and the DVE Morning Show, with Baumann currently as the show's sole host.

On January 31, 2014, Scott Paulsen again signed off from the Morning Show, two years after he returned to the station., citing he wanted to spend more time on his farm and, jokingly, become a woman. He and the other Morning Show members hinted at possibly becoming a guest contributor in the future

As a testament to the program's popularity, WDVE often reruns bits from the Morning Show at other times during the day. DVE disc jockeys Michele Michaels (10:00 am–3:00 pm) and Chad Tyson (3:00-8:00 pm) often play recent clips from the show intermittently during their respective times on air. Additionally, every Saturday from 8:00-10:00 am, the station airs The DVE Morning Show Reloaded featuring the best of the previous week's shows interjected in between songs. This is usually hosted by Val Porter.

== On-air personnel ==
=== Current ===
- Randy Baumann, host (2000–present)
- Tad Wissel, co-host (2026–present)
- Mike Prisuta, sportscaster (2002–present)
- Abby Krizner, newsreader (2024–present)

=== Former ===
- Scott Paulsen, host (1986-1999) and executive contributor/fill-in host (2012-2014)
- Jim Krenn, host (1988-2011)
- Phil Kirzyc, sports, later news (1988-1996)
- Dani Coates, newsreader (?-1996)
- Cris Winter, newsreader (1996-2001)
- Eddy Crow, sportscaster (1996-2002)
- Val Porter, newsreader (2001–2024)
- Bill Crawford, comedian (2012–2025)

== In other media ==
- In the late 1990s, Scott Paulsen, Jim Krenn and newsreader Cris Winter voiced characters on the Nickelodeon series Action League Now!
