= The Clarks (album) =

Studio album by The Clarks
- Released: August 1, 1991
- Genre: Rock
- Length: 45:30
- Label: King Mouse Records

The Clarks chronology
I'll Tell You What Man... (1988)	The Clarks (1991)	Love Gone Sour, Suspicion, and Bad Debt (1994)

The Clarks is a 1991 eponymous second album by Pittsburgh band The Clarks. Like their debut album, it was an independent release, but the album quickly gained a cult following in Western Pennsylvania and became a popular album in Pittsburgh. When WDVE, Pittsburgh's largest rock station, began playing "Penny on the Floor," the band achieved instant local fame. It was actually surprising at the time that radio stations would pick up "Penny On the Floor", a mandolin-driven song, as opposed to one of the band's more up tempo rock songs.

== Track listing ==
1. "If I Fall Through" – 3:08
2. "Thought It Was Free" – 4:01
3. "She Revolves" – 2:56
4. "What a Way to Go" – 5:30
5. "Daylights" – 3:20
6. "Dear Prudence" (The Beatles cover) – 4:05
7. "Spy" – 2:12
8. "King of the Asylum" – 3:15
9. "Goodbye" – 2:38
10. "Out of Sight, Out of Mind" – 3:04
11. "Penny on the Floor" – 3:55
12. "Train of Love" – 4:02
13. "Caroline" (hidden track) – 3:24

== Personnel ==
- Scott Blasey - lead vocals, acoustic & electric guitars
- Rob James - electric guitar, vocals
- Greg Joseph - bass guitar, vocals
- Dave Minarik - drums, vocals
