= Restless Days (album) =

Studio album by The Clarks
- Released: June 9, 2009
- Genre: Rock
- Label: High Wire Music
- Producer: Sean McDonald

The Clarks chronology
| Still Live (2006) | Restless Days (2009) | Songs in G (2010) |

Professional ratings
Review scores
| Source | Rating |
|---|---|
| Allmusic | 4/5 stars |

Restless Days is the eighth studio album by Pittsburgh band The Clarks. It was released on June 9, 2009.

== Track listing ==
1. "True Believer" (Blasey/Joseph)
2. "Inside" (Blasey)
3. "Trampoline" (Joseph)
4. "Midnight Rose" (Blasey)
5. "Soul and Skin" (Joseph)
6. "Sunshine" (Blasey)
7. "Come 'Round Here" (Joseph)
8. "Restless Days" (Blasey)
9. "The Clowns" (Joseph)
10. "The Runaway" (Joseph)
11. "In Between" (Joseph)
12. "What a Wonderful World" (Thiele/Weiss)

== Personnel ==
- Scott Blasey - lead vocals, acoustic and electric guitars
- Rob James - electric guitars, vocals
- Greg Joseph - bass guitar, vocals
- Dave Minarik - drums and vocals
- Skip Sanders - keyboards
- Gary W. Jacob - pedal steel
