= Scott Paulsen =

American radio personality and voice actor

- Born: May 23, 1959 (age 67); Chester, West Virginia, United States
- Occupations: Radio personality, columnist, voice actor
- Years active: 1970s–present
- Spouse: Kit Paulsen

Scott Paulsen (born May 23, 1959) is an American radio personality, columnist and voice actor based in Pittsburgh, Pennsylvania.

Paulsen began working for 96 KIX (WXKX) in the early 1980s and later WDVE, a Pittsburgh classic rock station, in the 1980s. He became a "morning staple" in the Pittsburgh region on The DVE Morning Show, which he co-hosted with Jim Krenn. Paulsen left the Morning Show and went on hiatus from WDVE for 11 months in 1999. He returned to WDVE in 2000 as a solo host The Scott Paulsen Radio Broadcast in the evening time slot. Paulsen left for WRKZ in December 2006 and took over the afternoon drive time slot. In keeping with the station's talk format, his new show focused more on guests, interviews, and phone calls than music. Paulsen left WKRZ when it changed to a Top 40 format and began a sports talk show with Eddy Crow and Mike Logan on ESPN 1250.

Paulsen writes a regular column for the Washington, Pennsylvania-based Observer–Reporter. He has also published numerous books including Cow Tipping and Night Fruit Army. In the 1990s, he and Jim Krenn provided voice talents for Nickelodeon's Action League Now!. NFL Films used an interview with Paulsen in 2006's Steelers program.

On Monday September 27, 2010 Scott along with Mike Logan, Stan Savran, Guy Junker, Ken Laird and Chris Mack were let go from ESPN RADIO 1250. "It was a business decision," said Tim McCarthy, senior vice president for ESPN Audio. Source: Jerry DiPiola Pittsburgh Tribune-Review.

On Thursday January 19, 2012 It was announced that Scott Paulsen was returning to The DVE Morning Show. In his return to the station, he became an "executive contributor" on the show as well as a fill-in host for Randy Baumann. At times, he also served as a fill-in DJ for Michele Michaels and Sean McDowell. On January 31, 2014, Paulsen announced he was again leaving the show, stating that he wanted to spend more time on his farm.

In late 2019, Paulsen relocated to Fredericksburg, Virginia and became the morning DJ on classic rock station 96.9 The Rock. But by early 2020, Scott was gone from WWUZ. He hosted a weekly radio show in 2023 on Beaver County Radio called Radio Stella that focused on the history of rock and roll.

== See also ==
- Jim Krenn
- Randy Baumann
- Bill Crawford
