= Another Happy Ending =

Studio album by The Clarks
- Released: June 11, 2002
- Genre: Rock
- Length: 47:18
- Label: Razor & Tie

The Clarks chronology
Strikes and Gutters (2001)	Another Happy Ending (2002)	Strikes and Gutters 2: Doublewide (2004)

Professional ratings
Review scores
Source	Rating
AllMusic	3/5 stars
Rolling Stone	5/5 stars

Another Happy Ending is the sixth album by Pittsburgh band The Clarks.

== History ==
The band's popularity continued to spread following the release of this album, as rock stations in Buffalo and Reading, Pennsylvania begin playing the record's lead single; however, Pittsburgh remained as the band's core fan base. The first single, "Hey You," was a highly emotional, beautifully-constructed song. Its sad, yet hopeful lyrics were inspired by the horrors of September 11, specifically the many World Trade Center workers who dove to their deaths from upper floors of the building. The other two hit songs were more upbeat—the mid-tempo "Boys Lie" and the excellent rhythm guitar song "On Saturday."

== Track listing ==
1. "Maybe" – 3:46 (Greg Joseph)
2. "All the Things I Wanted" – 3:46 (Scott Blasey)
3. "On Saturday" – 4:32 (Scott Blasey/Greg Joseph)
4. "Superstar" – 4:08 (Greg Joseph)
5. "Hey You" – 4:07 (Scott Blasey)
6. "Boys Lie" – 4:07 (Greg Joseph)
7. "Wasting Time" – 3:54 (Scott Blasey)
8. "Twist My Arm" – 3:24 (Greg Joseph)
9. "This Old House Is Burning Down Tonight" – 4:23 (Scott Blasey)
10. "Inside You" – 3:47 (Rob James)
11. "So You Can Sleep At Night" – 3:16 (Dave Minarik)
12. "Love Is What You Need" – 4:08 (Scott Blasey)

== Personnel ==
- Scott Blasey - lead vocals, acoustic & electric guitars
- Rob James - electric guitar, vocals
- Greg Joseph - bass guitar, vocals
- Dave Minarik - drums, vocals
