= Someday Maybe =

Studio album by The Clarks
- Released: November 25, 1996
- Genre: Rock
- Length: 59:52
- Label: MCA Records
- Producer: Tim Bomba

The Clarks chronology
Love Gone Sour, Suspicion, and Bad Debt (1994)	Someday Maybe (1996)	Live (1998)

Professional ratings
Review scores
Source	Rating
AllMusic	4/5 stars
Rolling Stone	5/5 stars

Someday Maybe is the 1996 fourth album by Pittsburgh band The Clarks. The record constituted both the band's first and last major label release. After two successful local records on a self-created label, MCA signed a deal with the band, giving them at least a shot at national success. However, MCA was in financial disarray at the time, due to it being bought out by a larger corporation. In turn, many struggling or newly signed bands were cut from the label. Before 'Someday Maybe' received any promotion, The Clarks were one of many bands that saw their contracts with MCA be terminated in 1997. Despite this heartbreak, the album did perform well in Pittsburgh. 'Stop!', a song that could draw comparison's 'For What It's Worth' by Buffalo Springfield, was intended to be the band's first nation single. Instead, it was relegated to only local success. The traditional rock love song 'Caroline' and the Southern rock influenced 'Mercury' were also major hits in the Pittsburgh market. The Clarks' problems with MCA nearly ruined their careers, and it certainly left them disillusioned with the recording industry. It would take 4 years for the band to release their next album.

== Track listing ==
1. "Stop!"
2. "Courtney"
3. "Mercury"
4. "Rain"
5. "Caroline"
6. "Never Let You Down"
7. "Fatal"
8. "The Box"
9. "One Day In My Life"
10. "No Place Called Home"
11. "Everything Has Changed"
12. "These Wishes"
13. "Last Call"
14. "Cigarette"

== Personnel ==
- Scott Blasey - lead vocals, acoustic & electric guitars
- Rob James - electric guitar, vocals
- Greg Joseph - bass guitar, vocals
- Dave Minarik - drums, vocals
