= Love Gone Sour, Suspicion, and Bad Debt =

Studio album by The Clarks
- Released: 1994
- Genre: Rock
- Length: 53:08
- Label: King Mouse Records

The Clarks chronology
The Clarks (1991)	Love Gone Sour, Suspicion, and Bad Debt (1994)	Someday Maybe (1996)

Professional ratings
Review scores
Source	Rating
AllMusic	3/5 stars
Pittsburgh Post-Gazette	3.5/4 stars

Love Gone Sour, Suspicion, and Bad Debt is the third album by the Pittsburgh, Pennsylvania, band the Clarks. The first single, "Cigarette", makes reference to Fayette County, the rural county located 35 miles south of Pittsburgh from which lead singer Scott Blasey hails. "Treehouse" and "Madeline" were local radio hits.

The album sold around 16,000 copies and led to a major label contract with MCA. It sold out of its initial pressing.

== Critical reception ==
The Pittsburgh Post-Gazette wrote that the album "cruises along with a hook-heavy obsessiveness that puts it right up there with Tom Petty & the Heartbreakers and every other guilty pleasure left over from the '70s." In 1996, Erie Times-News determined that it "completed a move toward a rootsier, Americana vibe that occasionally conjured up influences like Tom Petty, Bob Seger, Bruce Springsteen, and the Silos."

== Track listing ==
1. "Treehouse" – 3:00
2. "Cigarette" – 4:41
3. "Promised Land" – 5:09
4. "Now and Then" – 2:55
5. "Sun Don't Shine" – 4:02
6. "Better Day" – 2:34
7. "I'm the Only" – 4:38
8. "Behind My Back" – 3:34
9. "Climb Down" – 4:12
10. "Madeline" – 3:38
11. "Tell Me" – 3:45
12. "Already Down" – 3:44
13. "Sound the Warning" – 3:08
14. "Let You Go" – 4:08

== Personnel ==
- Scott Blasey - lead vocals, electric & acoustic guitars
- Rob James - electric guitar, vocals
- Greg Joseph - bass guitar, vocals
- Dave Minarik - drums, vocals
