= Jim Krenn =

American comedian and radio personality (born 1959)

- Born: 1958 or 1959 (age 66–67); Pittsburgh, Pennsylvania, United States
- Notable work: Host of The DVE Morning Show; Host of Jim Krenn: No Restrictions
- Spouse: Hedy Polifroni (m. 1993)

Comedy career
- Years active: 1988-present
- Medium: Standup, radio, podcast
- Website: www.jimkrenn.com

Jim Krenn (born 1958 or 1959) is an American comedian and radio personality, best known for his work on The DVE Morning Show on WDVE in Pittsburgh, Pennsylvania from 1988-December 6, 2011. Krenn and former partner Scott Paulsen provided most of the voices for the Nickelodeon Stop Motion animation series, Action League NOW!.

== History ==
Jim Krenn began on WDVE Radio in 1988. He worked with Scott Paulsen until 1999. Paulsen and Krenn dominated the ratings, holding the #1 spot in the advertising-coveted 25 to 54 demographic for the last ten years of their 12-year partnership. Krenn then partnered with Randy Baumann of Erie, PA in 2000 and continued dominating the ratings in the 25 to 54 demographic, beating every local and national competitor until his surprising dismissal from the WDVE Morning Show in December 2011, in spite of the ratings dominance. Krenn was quoted in several Pittsburgh publications as saying "I must be the only radio personality that has ever won a readers poll award, got his bonus check for being number one in the ratings and then fired all in the same week!" Read Jim Krenn's Press Conference Press Release. Following his departure from WDVE, he began a successful comedy podcast called No Restrictions..

In 2008, he mobilized a large portion of his listening audience to successfully locate his lost dog, Gizmo. He and his wife are well-known animal lovers and devote volunteer efforts to helping animals.

== Awards ==
The Mayor of Pittsburgh proclaimed February 22, 2008 "Jim Krenn Day" in the city, in honor of his twenty years as the King of Morning Radio, his charity work and contributions as a citizen of Pittsburgh.

In May 2010, Jim Krenn was given the prestigious Animal Friends Lifetime Achievement Award for his dedication to the shelter and his tireless work of helping abused animals over the years. Animal Friends of Pittsburgh has only given the award to eight individuals in their 75-year history.

In 2011 Pittsburgh City Council honored Krenn

In March 2012, Jim Krenn was given the Directors Community Service Award from the FBI, a national award given to a select few in honor of their leadership in the areas of community, charity and good citizenship.

In May 2012, the City Council of Pittsburgh officially proclaimed Jim Krenn the Honorary Ambassador of Pittsburgh.

Krenn has won numerous Readers Poll awards from several Pittsburgh publications in his radio career. An indication of his popularity in the Pittsburgh market: he won the City Paper's 2012 Readers Poll as "Pittsburgh's Favorite Radio Personality of the Year" even though he wasn't on the air as he was honoring a non-compete after his release from WDVE after 24 years.

== See also ==
- Scott Paulsen
- Randy Baumann
- Bill Crawford
