= Action League Now! =

American stop-motion comedy series

- Genre: Comedy; Action; Slapstick; Superhero
- Created by: Robert Mittenthal; Will McRobb; Albie Hecht
- Based on: Ruined toys
- Starring: Jim Krenn; Cris Winter; Scott Paulsen; Collin M. McGee; Alyssa Grahm
- Narrated by: Scott Paulsen
- Country of origin: United States
- Original language: English
- No. of seasons: 1 (on All That); 4 (on KaBlam!); 1 (as a package series)
- No. of episodes: 2 (on All That); 51 (on KaBlam!); 12 (as a package series); (list of episodes)

Production
- Production locations: Pittsburgh, Pennsylvania; Los Angeles, California
- Running time: 4 minutes (individual shorts); 24 minutes (package series)
- Production companies: Chuckimation; Nickelodeon Productions (seasons 2-6); Flying Mallet, Inc.

Original release
- Network: Nickelodeon
- Release: October 14, 1995 – February 10, 2002

Related
- All That; KaBlam!

Action League Now! (advertised as Action League Now!: The Series when packaged into a half-hour block) is a series of stop motion shorts that aired as part of both All That and KaBlam! on Nickelodeon. It was made using "chuckimation", a combination of stop-frame animation and live-action shots where things are simply thrown ("chucked") or dropped into frame to simulate movement, and wiggled around to simulate talking. The series follows the adventures of a superhero league, composed of various action figures, toys, and dolls. The show was created by Robert Mittenthal, Will McRobb, and Albie Hecht.

Most episodes took place in the house of an unseen resident. Many of the characters were voiced by radio personalities from Pittsburgh.

From November 25, 2001 until February 10, 2002, Nickelodeon briefly ran Action League Now! shorts on their own, combined to fill a half-hour timeslot.

== Characters ==
- The Flesh (voiced by Jim Krenn): A blonde, dimwitted, muscular bodybuilder with superhuman strength. The Flesh is sometimes clumsy, but he does not get in the way of the other Action Leaguers when they're trying to save the day. The figure used for Flesh was a modified Conan the Adventurer action figure.
- Thundergirl (voiced by Cris Winter): The only female member of the team, as well as the only one with the ability to fly. A running gag is Thunder Girl stating that she will use her super strength only to remember too late that she doesn't have super strength. The figure used for Thundergirl was a Sindy doll's head on a Wonder Woman-esque figure body.
- Stinky Diver (voiced by Jim Krenn): A mustachioed diver who is often seen in or around toilets. Stinky has a foul odor, but the Action League seems to have gotten used to it and do not mind it most of the time. Although he lacks any superpowers, he has the ability to pull a spear gun out of thin air and can fire a seemingly endless amount of plastic missiles. Stinky is an altered 1994 G.I. Joe Shipwreck action figure.
- Meltman (voiced by Scott Paulsen): Meltman has the "power" to melt and is the smallest and weakest member of the Action League. He has a long-running crush on Thundergirl, who does not reciprocate his feelings for her. As melting is his only ability, Meltman is quite unhelpful and a borderline burden and is considered by the rest of the League to be their personal servant, often fulfilling such chores as getting them sodas, donuts, and other things. In two different episodes, it is revealed that his full name is Barry Meltfarb, although he claims to have changed the surname to his superhero name. Meltman is a Robin Hood figure that was melted with a blow torch.
- The Chief (voiced by Collin M. McGee; initially voiced by Victor Hart): The head of the Action League, the Chief is an angry, frustrated man who frequently yells at the Action League for their mistakes and unintended backtalk. The Chief was made by putting together and modifying parts from Playskool "Play People" dollhouse figures.
- Justice (voiced by Alyssa Grahm): The Chief's beloved Golden Retriever and best friend. Technically a member of the Action League, Justice serves as the Lassie of the show, warning fellow members of the League of dangers that they were otherwise unaware of.
- The Mayor (voiced by Jim Krenn): The Action League's archenemy. Many of his schemes revolve around making money. In the episode "A Star is Torn", he uses the alias Louis D. Mayor (a reference to Louis B. Mayer). The Mayor was pieced together from various Playskool dollhouse figures. The voice that Jim Krenn used for the character was initially a parody of then-Pittsburgh mayor Tom Murphy.
- Bill the Lab Guy (voiced by Jim Krenn): A scientist who often messes up his experiments and predicaments. Bill takes himself very seriously as a scientist, even though his experiments almost always go awry. Bill, along with the Mayor and the Chief, was pieced together in part from various Playskool dollhouse figures. His name is a reference to Bill Nye the Science Guy.
- Hodge Podge (voiced by Jim Krenn): The Action League's former accountant, Hodge Podge was accidentally thrown into and chopped up in a blender, then rebuilt by Bill the Lab Guy against his will, making him a freak with parts of random toys and household objects.
- Quarky (voiced by Cris Winter): Bill the Lab Guy's teenage daughter who helps him around the lab. Occasionally, she gets into situations that the Action League has to rescue her from.
- The Announcer (voiced by Scott Paulsen): The narrator of the program, using various alliterations and overreactions often before and after the short's commercial bridge. He sometimes breaks the fourth wall during an episode. He has a deep, monotone voice, not unlike Bill the Lab Guy's and is never seen, only heard.

The Action League have had various other villains throughout the show's run, including (but not limited to) a gigantic baby simply named "Big Baby", a Mesozoic monster (in reality, a Jack Russell Terrier) called Spotzilla, a rival superhero league known as the Danger Society, a bald genius known as Smarty Pants, an enemy of Stinky's past called Red Ninja, a group of evil aliens, a gypsy who cursed The Chief, a married couple who pretended to be Flesh's parents and a mummy brought to life by The Mayor. Sometimes, due to their own collective stupidity, even the League themselves can be the main cause of a problem.

== Episodes ==
No.	Title	Original release date
1	"Pilot"	March 21, 1998
I've Been Working on Derailroad – The Action League is called in to prevent his dishonor, the Mayor, from crashing trains.; Stinky on Ice – Stinky Diver becomes trapped in a bowl of gelatin and the remaining League members must rescue him.
2	"Action League Goes to the Movies"	November 25, 2001
Armageddon Outta Here – The Action League goes into space to prevent an asteroid from crashing into Earth.; Incident at Chlorine Lake – A giant fish threatens the lives of swimmers at the beach.; Yurplastic Park – The League becomes trapped on an island populated by dinosaurs cloned by Bill the lab guy.; A Star is Torn – Posing as a director, the Mayor scouts Thunder Girl to star in a movie featuring lethal stunts.
3	"Smash Hits"	December 2, 2001
Road to Ruin – The League must put a stop to the Mayor's plan to litter the road with trash.; Nightmare on Memory Lane – Meltman loses his memory and the rest of the League tries to help him recover it and an important formula.; Roughing the Passer – The Action League acts as bodyguards for NFL quarterbacks, who are under threat from the Mayor.; And Justice for None – The League must prove themselves true heroes when a tribunal decides to terminate them.
4	"Science Friction"	December 9, 2001
Tears of a Clone – The Mayor creates clones of the League as a distraction while he pilfers all the incredibly breakable china.; What's Eating The Flesh – When the Flesh contracts a contagious body eating virus, Bill the lab guy seeks a cure before the rest of the league get it.; The Quarky Syndrome – Bill the lab guy's daughter, Quarky, becomes a superhero after being exposed to nuclear waste from the Mayor's nuclear reactor.; Science Fiction Parody – Aliens come to Earth in peace, until the League's stupidity causes them to turn hostile.
5	"Action League Rocks!"	December 16, 2001
Rock-A-Big Baby – The loud music of a Kiss concert awakens Big Baby, and the League must save the band from the cranky infant.; Hit of Horror – Hodge Podge uses a radio station to brainwash the public into destroying the Action League.; In the Whine of Fire – Meltman wins the heart of popstar Blandi while protecting her from the Mayor, who wants to eliminate his competition for most popular musician.
6	"Stinky Diver: Behind the Mask"	December 23, 2001
Flippers of Fury – When an old rival, Red Ninja, returns for revenge, Stinky must brush up on his martial art from his sensei, Master Pu.; Mad Dogs and Englishmen – Still reeling from a past betrayal, Stinky bonds with a stray, unaware he's actually the Mayor's evil attack dog.; Stink or Swim – Stinky is reminded of a traumatic event, and developed a fear of diving.; Winds of Evil – The Mayor uses a giant fan to blow away the League's homes, leaving them with one option: staying at Stinky's toilet.
7	"The Chief: Look Back in Anger"	December 30, 2001
Hey! Who Stole My Face? – After an accident switches his face for the Chief's, the Mayor takes control of the Action League.; Fatter – An angry gypsy places a curse on the Chief, which causes him to eat uncontrollably until he explodes.; Grief for The Chief – After the Chief is hospitalized by another of their screw ups, the League thinks back to all the times they've caused him pain.; Dog Day Afterschool – The Mayor traps the Chief's dog, Justice, in a rocket bound for space.
8	"I'll Melt for You"	January 6, 2002
Meltman at Large – Tired of feeling useless, Meltman takes a formula that makes him grow giant.; Melty's Girl – Meltman gets a new girlfriend and lies about being a big superhero called Dr. Melt.; Tune Up of Terror – Hodge Podge takes the league on a wild ride when he takes control of the Action mobile.; In the Belly of the Beast – It's up to Meltman to save the day when the Mayor traps the other league members in a vacuum cleaner.
9	"Monster Mashed"	January 13, 2002
The Wrath of Spotzilla (Part 1); The Wrath of Spotzilla (Part 2); Melty Dearest – Meltman becomes parent to a giant spider after mistaking it's egg for a ping pong ball.; Rags to Riches – A mummy is brought to life after the Mayor steals a jewel from its sarcophagus.
10	"The Many Faces of Evil"	January 20, 2002
Revenge of Hodge Podge – The League's former accountant turned supervillain seeks revenge on the League for turning him into a monster.; A Flesh of Brilliance – Flesh is rendered a genius and matches whits with the villainous Smarty-pants.; Big Baby – The Mayor puts the Big Baby on display only for him to escape and take Quarky captive.; Voice of Treason – Hodge Podge gets hold of a voice changing device and uses it to put the Action League into a trap.
11	"His Dishonor"	January 27, 2002
Turkey of Terror – As a gesture of peace, the Mayor invites the League to Thanksgiving dinner, but plans for them to be stuffed in the turkey.; Chickie Chickie Bang Bang – The Mayor smuggles in a pair of Easter chicks, that multiply into a ravenous swarm that threatens the world food supply.; No Fly Zone – Thunder Girl's power to fly is removed by the Mayor, who holds two kids for ransom in a birdhouse.; Testimony of Terror – The League is tasked with protecting a witness to the Mayor's crimes, a boy who likes to play dangerous pranks on his protectors.
12	"Naked Came the Numskull"	February 3, 2002
The Naked and the Dumb – The dimwitted Flesh must pass an exam in order to renew his hero licence.; Danger for a Dignitary – The Flesh must take the place of a lookalike ambassador after he injures the dignitary.; Flesh and Blood – A couple introduce themselves as the Flesh's long lost parents, but are really crooks wanting to use him to commit a robbery.; RoboFlesh – The Mayor creates an evil robot double of the Flesh to destroy the League.
13	"Thunder Girl: Tracking The Storm"	February 10, 2002
Thunder and Lightning – Thunder Girl has competition with Lightning Lady, who turns out to be an evil infiltrator.; Caged Thunder – The Action League is captured by the Nextdooria Force, whose General plans to dominate the world with missiles.; Art of Thunder – The Action tries to recover a picture stolen by The Mayor.; Sinkhole of Doom – The Action has to rescue Piers from the sink, while Thunder Girl and Stinky wind up trapped on a ceiling fan.
EX	"Other Episodes"	
Where Pigeons Dare – The League is tasked with protecting the eggs of the recently deceased Pigeon Queen.; Danger Society – The League faces dissolution when a competent group of heroes sets up shop.

== Guest appearances ==
- There have been numerous guest appearances, including National Football League quarterbacks Brett Favre, John Elway, Kordell Stewart, Troy Aikman, and coach Bill Cowher, the rock band Kiss, musician-actor Harry Connick, Jr., pop singer Robyn, and musician Lou Rawls. All voiced themselves on the program (with the exception of Robyn and Connick, who voiced Blandi and Big Baby, respectively, in the episode "Rock-a-big Baby" which was paired theatrically with Good Burger).

== Banned episodes ==
Some episodes of Action League Now! are banned in the United States. The KaBlam! episode titled "I Just Don't Get It", which featured an Action League Now! short that involved an attack on the U.S. capitol, was put under a ban after the September 11 attacks. The Action League Now!: The Series episode "Thunder Girl: Tracking the Storm" which also contained the short was put on a ban after its initial broadcast in 2002, only being re-shown in 2016 on the late night TV block "The Splat" on TeenNick. The episode was formerly available to stream on Paramount+ before the show's removal from the platform on December 17, 2025. One specific episode, "ThunderFlesh", was intended to appear in season 2 of KaBlam!, but was shelved due to its adult content as another episode was created to replace it.

== Reception ==
In a Chicago Tribune article, Jennifer Mangan complimented the series' originality, calling it "the most innovative entrant in KaBlam!'s cartoon catalog." Jane Hall of the Los Angeles Times wrote that Action League Now! "has the weird, aggressive humor of the old 'Mr. Bill' pieces on Saturday Night Live." Naming the show among other KaBlam! segments, Deadline Hollywood's Mike Fleming wrote positively of its "absurdly unforgettable characters."
