= I'll Tell You What Man... =

Studio album by The Clarks
- Released: June 1988
- Genre: Rock
- Length: 38:43
- Label: King Mouse Records

The Clarks chronology
| I'll Tell You What Man... (1988) | The Clarks (1991) |

Professional ratings
Review scores
| Source | Rating |
|---|---|
| AllMusic | 4/5 stars |

I'll Tell You What Man... is the 1988 debut album by Pittsburgh band the Clarks. The album was the band's first release, created while the musicians were still in college at Indiana University of Pennsylvania. The fast-paced song "Help Me Out" gained some airplay on Western Pennsylvania college radio stations, but at this point, the Clarks had yet to achieve success.

== Track listing ==
1. "Hesitating"
2. "Perfection Not Required"
3. "In the End"
4. "Let Me Die"
5. "Pretty as You Please"
6. "Help Me Out"
7. "On My Way Back Home"
8. "I'm the Only"
9. "All That Much"
10. "Hear It from You"
11. "Today"

== Personnel ==
- Scott Blasey - lead vocals, acoustic & electric guitars
- Rob James - electric guitar, vocals
- Greg Joseph - bass guitar, vocals
- Dave Minarik - drums, vocals
