= WRRK =

- Braddock, Pennsylvania; United States
- Broadcast area: Pittsburgh metropolitan area
- Frequency: 96.9 MHz (HD Radio)
- Branding: 96.9 Bob FM

Programming
- Language: English
- Format: Variety hits
- Subchannels: HD2: Sports gambling "Bet Sports Radio"; HD3: Variety "Yinz Radio"; HD4: WPTS-FM simulcast
- Affiliations: Washington Wild Things

Ownership
- Owner: The Frischling Family; (WPNT Media Subsidiary - Steel City Media)
- Sister stations: WLTJ

History
- First air date: June 1959; 67 years ago
- Former call signs: WLOA-FM (1959–1977); WFFM (1977–1982); WHYW (1982–1986); WMYG (1986–1991)
- Call sign meaning: "Rock" (former format and branding)

Technical information
- Licensing authority: FCC
- Facility ID: 72333
- Class: B
- ERP: 45,000 watts
- HAAT: 162 meters (531 ft)
- Transmitter coordinates: 40°24′42.2″N 79°55′52.2″W

Links
- Public license information: Public file; LMS
- Webcast: Listen live
- Website: www.bobfm969.com

WRRK (96.9 FM) is a commercial radio station licensed to Braddock, Pennsylvania, and serving the Pittsburgh metropolitan area. It airs a variety hits radio format, known as "96.9 BOB-FM" with studios on McKnight Road in Pittsburgh's North Hills. WRRK is owned by Saul Frischling and his family, through licensee WPNT Media Subsidiary, LLC, identified on the website as Steel City Media.

WRRK has an effective radiated power (ERP) of 45,000 watts, its transmitter is located off Longview Street in the Hazelwood neighborhood. WRRK broadcasts using HD Radio technology, its three subchannels carry sports gambling, variety and oldies formats.

== History ==
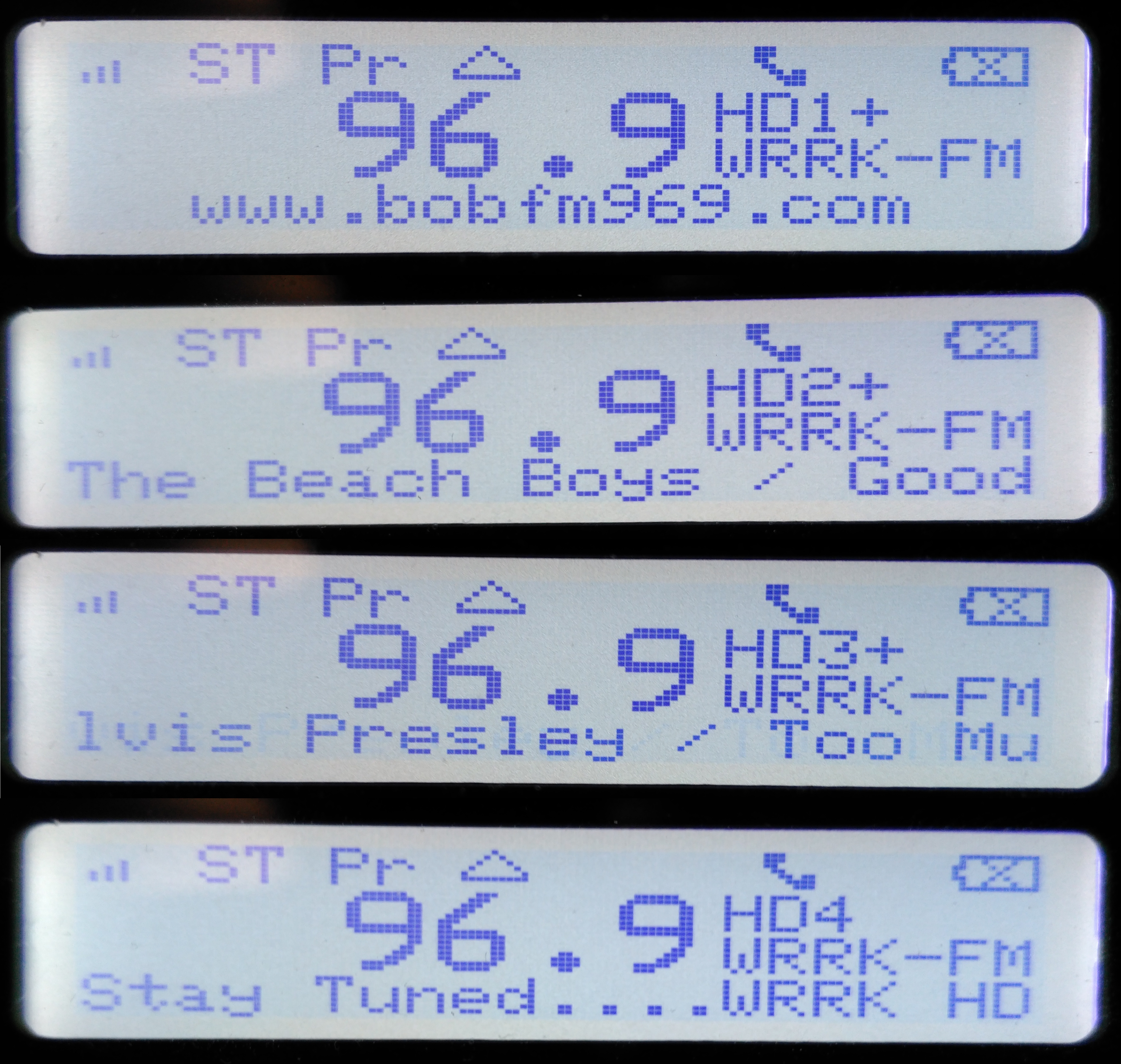
WRRK's HD Radio Channels on a SPARC Radio with PSD and EAS.

=== Easy Listening and Soft Rock ===
In November 1957, Matta Broadcasting Company applied for a construction permit from the Federal Communications Commission to build a new FM station. Matta owned an AM station, 1550 WLOA (now WZUM), also licensed to Braddock. It was granted the permit in February 1958. The station signed on the air as WLOA-FM in June 1959. Transmitter facilities were located on a hill just northeast of Braddock. Studios were co-located with the AM station at 1233 Braddock Avenue in Braddock.

As WLOA was a daytime-only station at the time, its new FM sister provided nighttime radio service after the AM was required to sign off at local sunset. The rest of the day, the two stations mostly simulcast their programming, with formats varying between easy listening and adult contemporary.

Station co-founder William G. Matta died in 1971. The stations were transferred from his estate to William J. Matta and Mrs. E.R. Matta in 1973. William J. Matta took sole ownership of the station in 1975. The station underwent a format change in 1977 to "soft rock"—a hybrid of Top 40 and adult contemporary music. The call sign changed to WFFM, adopting the moniker "FM 97." In 1979, the station modified its call letters to WFFM-FM (as its AM sister adopted those same calls), and then reverted to WFFM again in May 1981, receiving permission from the FCC five months later to dually identify its community of license as "Braddock-Pittsburgh".

In May 1982, Matta Broadcasting Company sold WFFM and its AM sister station WCKG to Benns Communications. WFFM changed its call sign to WHYW with the new ownership.

=== Classic Rock ===
In 1985, WHYW began featuring classic rock from 7 p.m. to midnight while retaining the soft rock format from 5 a.m. to 7 p.m. It also played jazz overnight, and maintaining its "Y-97 FM" identity. In March 1986 the station went to 24-hour classic rock. At that point, Benns changed the call sign to WMYG and the station referred to itself as "Magic Y-97 FM" (it shortened the brand to simply "Magic 97 FM" later that year).

In 1991, the station switched to a current-based album rock format, and the call letters were changed to WRRK, taking on the branding "97 Rock." (WRRK was previously the call sign of a top 40/rock station in Manistee, Michigan.) When Legend Communications bought the station in 1993, the classic rock format was resurrected, but the station retained the WRRK call letters and identified itself as "Magic 97 WRRK." The format lasted for 13 years, as "Channel 97" and "97 RRK."

=== Adult Hits Bob-FM ===
On November 1, 2005, WRRK flipped to adult hits as "96.9 BOB-FM." BOB-FM is usually ranked among Pittsburgh's most listened-to stations in the Nielsen ratings.

== HD Radio ==
WRRK broadcasts using HD Radio technology. Its subchannels previously featured spin-offs of the main format, with HD2 carrying "Bob's B-Sides", HD3 carrying "Bob's Malt Shop" (an oldies format focusing on music from the 1950s and 1960s), and HD4 carrying "Stay Tuned" (featuring television and movie theme music).

On February 11, 2022, WRRK-HD2 flipped to sports talk as Bet Sports Radio, carrying programming from the Vegas Stats & Information Network (VSiN).
