= WDVE =

Classic rock radio station in Pittsburgh

- Pittsburgh, Pennsylvania; United States
- Broadcast area: Pittsburgh metropolitan area
- Frequency: 102.5 MHz (HD Radio)
- Branding: 102.5 [W]DVE

Programming
- Format: Classic rock
- Subchannels: HD2: Steelers Nation Radio
- Affiliations: Pittsburgh Steelers Audio Network

Ownership
- Owner: iHeartMedia; (iHM Licenses, LLC)
- Sister stations: WBGG, WKST-FM, WPGB, WWSW-FM, WXDX-FM

History
- First air date: May 12, 1962
- Former call signs: KQV-FM (1962–1970)
- Call sign meaning: "Wonderful Dove"

Technical information
- Licensing authority: FCC
- Facility ID: 59588
- Class: B
- ERP: 55,000 watts (analog); 1,800 watts (digital)
- HAAT: 250 meters (820 ft)
- Transmitter coordinates: 40°29′38.2″N 80°1′8.1″W

Links
- Public license information: Public file; LMS
- Webcast: Listen live (via iHeartRadio)
- Website: dve.iheart.com

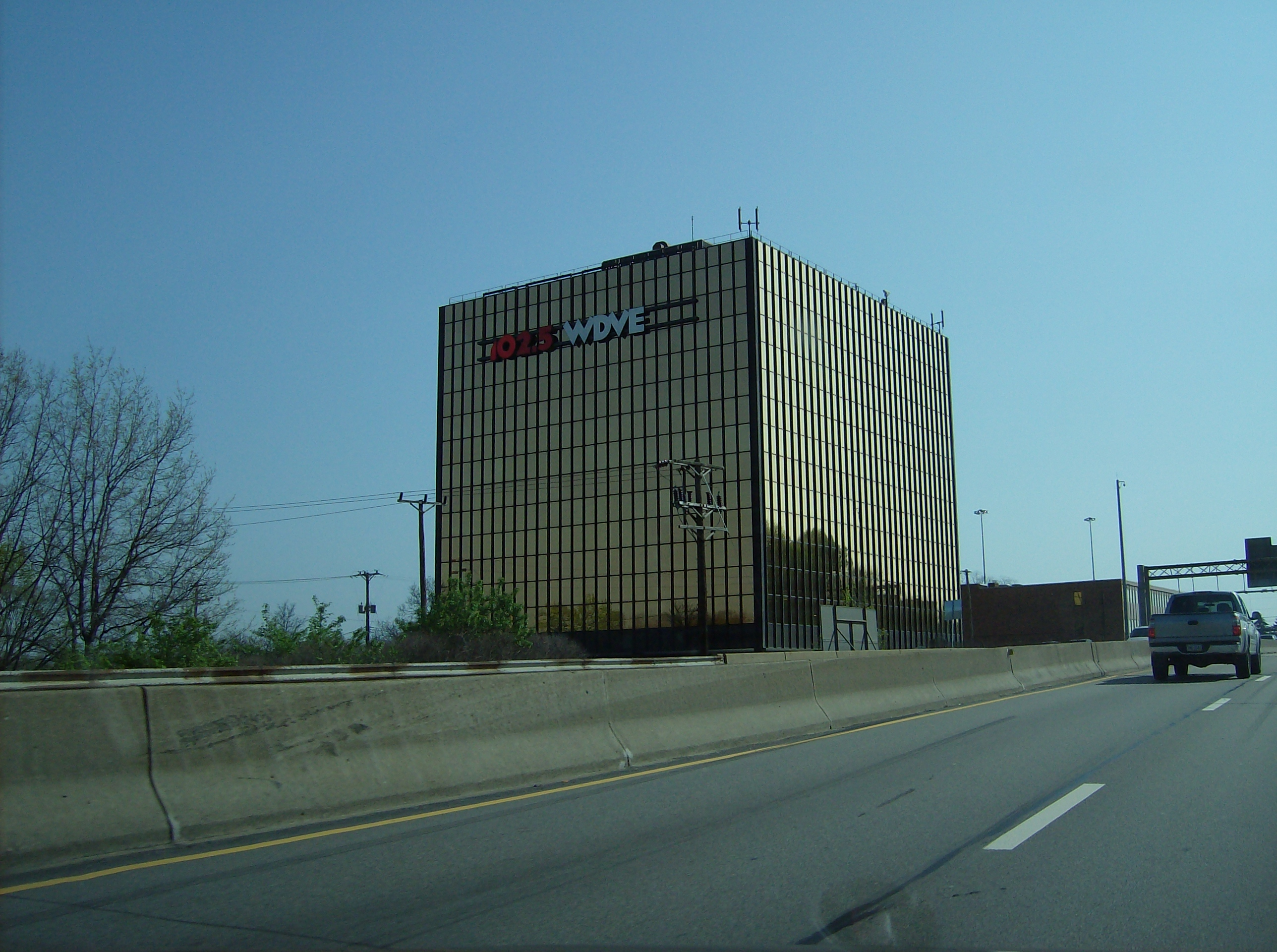
WDVE's former studios next to Interstate 376 in Green Tree. The station moved to Bridgeville in 2021, but the WDVE sign remained on the building until 2025.

WDVE (102.5 FM) is a classic rock music-formatted radio station in Pittsburgh, Pennsylvania, at 102.5 MHz. It is often referred to by Pittsburghers as simply "DVE". Its studios and offices are located on Abele Rd. in Bridgeville next to I-79, along with its sister stations. Its transmitter is located on Pittsburgh's North Side. Since 2006, the station has been the highest-rated radio station in the Pittsburgh market, surpassing longtime market leader KDKA. The station is currently owned by iHeartMedia, and (along with WBGG) serves as the flagship radio station of the Pittsburgh Steelers radio network.

WDVE is designated a superpower station by the Federal Communications Commission. The station's effective radiated power of 55,000 watts exceeds the maximum limit set by the FCC for a Class B FM radio station.

WDVE uses HD Radio and broadcasts a sports format on its HD2 subchannel branded as Steelers Nation Radio.

== History ==
The radio station signed on the air on December 11, 1946, as KQV-FM and simulcasted then-sister station KQV. The new programming was a tape service of a freeform rock format entitled "Love", created by ABC official Allen Shaw designed specifically for airing on the 7 FM stations owned by ABC. Shaw changed the format from the automated "Love" format to live Freeform AOR in 1970. The station's current call letters were chosen in December 1970 at the height of the "hippie" era.

"WDVE" was derived from the word "Wonderful Dove", the bird of peace, though the station has never had an easy listening, Christian contemporary music, or soft rock format which would soon be more associated with future "Dove"-branded stations like Tampa's WDUV, or WDVV in Wilmington, North Carolina.

In the fall of 1971, Shaw, along with ABC Radio programming executive Bob Henaberry, replaced the freeform rock programming with the very first AOR format, playing only the best cuts from the best selling rock albums with minimal disc jockey talk. WDVE was the most successful FM radio station in Pittsburgh throughout the 1970s. In early print marketing, the phrase Rock 'N' Stereo! Pittsburgh's Pure Rock WDVE 102½ FM, The Radio Station, was set in white text against a black oval background surrounded by vivid rainbow like colors. Years later, the logo was rendered in white and yellow with red accents against a black background, generally using the slogan 102.5 WDVE Rocks.

Starting in the 1980s, the station started playing the Beat Farmers song Happy Boy every Friday around 3 p.m. at the start of the afternoon drive time shift to signal the end of the work week and the start of the weekend. On Fridays at noon, they air a recording of the band KISS saying; "Hey yinz guys! It's FRIDAY!!", immediately followed by "Rock and Roll All Nite".

Radio personality and WEBN alum Maxwell Slater "Max" Logan (Ben Bornstein), formerly heard on WMMS, WNCX in Cleveland and now on WLUP-FM in Chicago as host of The Maxwell Show, spent time at WDVE in the mid-1990s.

In 1999, WDVE bought the rights to broadcast the Pittsburgh Steelers alongside WWSW, now known as WBGG, and the two stations continue broadcasting Steelers games as the Steelers' flagship stations.

In addition to its status as flagship station of the Steelers, WDVE served for years as the flagship station of the Pittsburgh Penguins (until 2006 when sister station WXDX-FM became the Penguins' flagship), promoting itself with such oddities as a young Jaromír Jágr reading the morning weather forecast in heavily accented English during his suspension from the NHL.

Because of the station having a largely male audience, the station refers to fellow iHeartMedia stations WXDX-FM and WPGB as "brother" stations as opposed to the more commonly used term "sister" station, since WXDX-FM also has a predominantly male audience and all three have younger listeners. In recent years, the station's format has gradually drifted towards classic rock, with current releases rarely incorporated into the playlist. Pittsburgh had been without a full-time classic rock station since the flip of WRRK to adult hits, even though iHeartMedia considers the station as a classic rocker; however, since 2016, WDVE has added more newer rock tracks that were not being played on co-owned WXDX, with the station gradually shifting to a more mainstream rock direction.

Currently, the station air staff consists of morning show host Randy Baumann, morning show co-host Tad Wissel, morning news reader and night host Abby Krizner, morning sportscaster Mike Prisuta, mid-day host Michele Michaels, afternoon and weekend host Chad Tyson, and weekend hosts Frank Cindrich, Cris Winter, and Eric Taylor. The station has maintained a robust, stable lineup of local personalities through the years despite numerous rounds of nationwide cutbacks by iHeartMedia.

== Morning Show ==
As of January 2024 Randy Baumann and the DVE Morning Show airs weekdays. The rest of the morning show team are newsreader Abby Krizner, sportscaster Mike Prisuta, and comedian Bill Crawford. The show features a variety of comedy skits, musical parodies, and music.

Prior to hosting solo, Baumann was teamed with Jim Krenn starting in early 2000. Prior to that, Krenn had been on with Scott Paulsen, who along with "News Goddess" Lauri Githens had hosted the morning show from 1986-1988 (after "Little Jimmy" Roach and "Big Steve" Hansen of "The DVE Morning Alternative" were not offered a new contract after their 1980-1986 stint).

On January 18, 2010, the morning show returned to the air without Randy Baumann and used the name "DVE Morning Show" (rather than "Jim and Randy and the DVE Morning Show"). Randy Baumann's contract had expired at the beginning of 2010 and he returned to the airwaves on February 17, 2010, after contract negotiations had been settled. The show resumed its previous title "Jim and Randy and the DVE Morning Show".

On December 31, 2011, iHeartMedia (then known as Clear Channel Communications) announced that Jim Krenn would no longer be part of the DVE Morning show but would still be employed at the station. According to a statement made by Dennis Lamme, President and Market Manager of Clear Channel Media & Entertainment-Pittsburgh, "We are currently in discussion with Jim about his role with the station moving forward.". They are again using the name "DVE Morning Show". Krenn's official departure from Clear Channel was announced on January 19, 2012. As of February 23, 2012, WDVE has branded the morning show "Randy Baumann and the DVE Morning Show".

== Other media ==
- Staff at WDVE provided voices for the segment Action League Now! on Nickelodeon's KaBlam!.
- An extra in the 1986 movie Gung Ho wore a WDVE t-shirt on-screen. The movie, starring Coraopolis native Michael Keaton, was largely shot in Beaver County, just a short drive up Interstate 376 from WDVE's studios.
- Bumper stickers for the station appear in the Mark Wahlberg movie, Rock Star, set in Pittsburgh.

== WDVE HD2 ==
WDVE broadcasts on its HD2 subchannel dates back to 2006, when the subchannel launched a format focusing on Blues music. In August 2011, HD2 became a 24-hour channel devoted to Steelers coverage, billed as "Steelers Nation Radio."
