= Scott Blasey =

American rock musician (born 1964)

- Blasey in 2024

Background information
- Born: October 31, 1964 (age 62); Connellsville, Pennsylvania, U.S.
- Genres: Rock, alternative rock, garage rock
- Instruments: Guitar, vocals
- Years active: 1986–present
- Website: www.scottblasey.com

Scott Edward Blasey is an American rock musician best known as the lead vocalist for The Clarks, a position he has held since the band's inception in the mid-1980s. Blasey has also released three solo albums.

== Biography ==
Born in Connellsville, Pennsylvania in 1964, Blasey graduated from Connellsville Area Senior High School in 1982. He then began attending Indiana University of Pennsylvania. There, he met guitarist Rob James, bassist Greg Joseph, and drummer Dave Minarik. Blasey, James, and Minarik first began playing together as "The Administration." When Joseph joined the three in 1986, they became "The Clarks." Initially a cover band, the quartet soon started writing and performing original material, with much of the writing output produced by Blasey and Joseph.

Blasey graduated from Indiana University of Pennsylvania in 1987. Soon afterward, The Clarks began recording their music. Their first studio album, I'll Tell You What Man..., was released in 1988. The song "Help Me Out" received some radio airplay on Western Pennsylvania stations. I'll Tell You what Man... was followed by The Clarks in 1991, which introduced "Penny on the Floor." Love Gone Sour, Suspicion, and Bad Debt (1994) and Someday Maybe (1996) followed, introducing "Cigarette" and "Mercury", respectively.

In 1995, Blasey's first solo album, Don't Try This at Home, was released. It was recorded at Studio L in Weirton, West Virginia.

Blasey's second solo album, Shine, was released in 1999. Blasey appeared on Donnie Iris and the Cruisers' ninth studio album, Together Alone, on which he sang guest vocals on "Amazing Grace."

Over the course of the 2000s, Blasey recorded six studio albums with The Clarks: Let it Go (2000), Another Happy Ending (2002), Fast Moving Cars (2004), Restless Days (2009), Feathers & Bones (2014), and Madly in Love at the End of the World (2018). He continues to play with The Clarks as well as solo shows, mostly throughout the Pittsburgh region. In 2007, he released his third studio album, Travelin' On, recorded in Dallas with producer Salim Nourallah.

Blasey also plays acoustic shows with fellow Clarks members Rob James and Greg Joseph as "Scott, Rob and Greg of the Clarks." The three originally played acoustic shows as "The Infamous Dicks," but that name was phased out.

== Personal life ==
Scott Blasey has been married to Denise Blasey since 2004. They moved to Dallas later that year, and returned to Western Pennsylvania in 2007. They have three daughters.

== Discography ==
=== Solo work ===
- Don't Try This at Home (1995)
- Shine (1999)
- Travelin' On (2007)
- Three the Hard Way EP (2024)
