= List of Mt. Lebanon High School alumni and faculty =

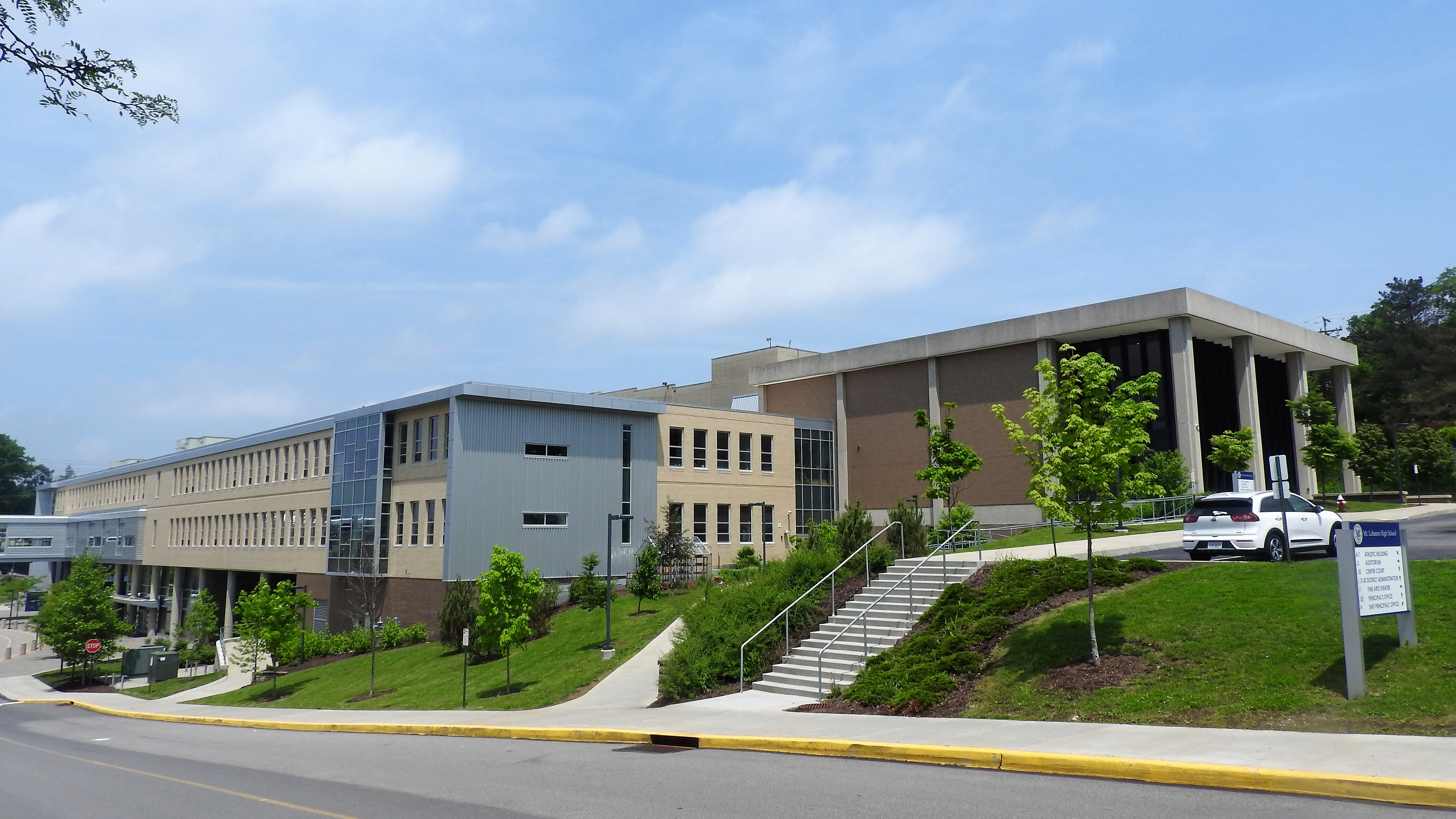
Mt. Lebanon High School Fine Arts Theatre and Science Wing

The following is a list of notable alumni and faculty from Mt. Lebanon High School, a four-year public high school in Mt. Lebanon, Pennsylvania, a South Hills suburb of Pittsburgh.

== Notable alumni ==
=== Athletics ===
- Eric Angle (born 1967) - professional wrestler
- Kurt Angle (born 1968) - Olympic gold medalist in freestyle wrestling and former professional wrestler
- Troy Apke (born 1995) - NFL cornerback and special teamer
- Matt Bartkowski (born 1988) - NHL ice hockey defenseman
- Mia Bhuta (born 2005) - soccer player
- Gene Breen (born 1941) - NFL football player
- Mike Cawley (born 1971) - CFL football player
- Ave Daniell (1914-1999) - football tackle
- Jim Daniell (1918-1983) - NFL football player
- Bill Davidson (1915-1970) - NFL football player
- John Fitsioris - professional basketball player
- John E. Frank (born 1962) - NFL football player and surgeon
- Justin Geisinger, NFL football player
- Curt Grieve, college football player
- Jim Haney, college basketball coach, former University of Oregon head coach
- Ian Happ (born 1994) - MLB player
- Eli Heidenreich (born 2003) - NFL player
- Chris Jelic (born 1963) - MLB baseball player
- Tom Jelley (1926–2014) - NFL football player
- Donald Johnson (born 1968) - professional tennis player
- Don T. Kelly (born 1980) - MLB player and coach
- Austin Kitchen (born 1997) - MLB baseball player
- Rich Lackner (born 1956) - football coach
- Roberta McCallum (born 1958) - professional tennis player
- John O'Hara (born 1959) - professional soccer player
- Rick Peterson (born 1954) - baseball coach and former pitcher
- Gretchen Rush (born 1964) - professional tennis player
- Richard Rydze (1950-2023) - Olympic diver and doctor
- Colby Sorsdal (born 2000) - NFL offensive lineman
- David Shields (born 2006) - MLB baseball player
- Luke Stout - former Princeton Tigers wrestler and Ivy League Champion
- Mac Stout - Pitt Panthers and ACC champion wrestler
- Alex Tecza - NFL football running back
- Deion Turman - professional basketball player
- Brian S. Williams (born 1966) - NFL football center
- Josh Wilson (born 1981) - MLB player
- Patrick Wey (born 1991) - NHL hockey player

=== Business ===
- Mark Cuban (born 1958) - billionaire, entrepreneur, media personality, Dallas Mavericks owner
- Brian Cuban (born 1961) - attorney and author
- David C. Farrell (1933-2023) - businessman, retail executive, and philanthropist, former president of Kaufman's and May Department Stores
- Joseph Hardy (1923-2023) - billionaire, businessman, philanthropist, founder of 84 Lumber and Nemacolin Woodlands resort
- Thomas Finke - investor, executive, businessman, former president of MassMutual and CEO of Barings LLC
- Andrew Mason (born 1981) - founder and former CEO of Groupon
- Robert W. Lucky (1938-2022) - electrical engineer and entrepreneur
- Joel Peresman - music industry executive, president and chief executive officer of the Rock and Roll Hall of Fame Foundation
- Rich Skrenta (born 1967) - computer programmer and tech entrepreneur, co-founder of Blekko, creator of Elk Cloner virus
- John P. Surma (born 1954) - businessman, former CEO of US Steel, minority owner of Pittsburgh Penguins
- Bob Truel - computer programmer and tech entrepreneur, co-founder of Blekko

=== Entertainment & Media ===
- Eugenie Baird, jazz singer
- Carl Betz (1921-1978) - actor
- Gloria Bigelow, comedian and actress
- Patti Burns (1952-2001) - journalist and TV news anchor
- Frank Cappelli (1952-2018) - actor and singer
- Twink Caplan (born 1947) - actress
- Christina Cindrich (born 1981 or 1982) - actress and television host
- Daya (born 1998) - Grammy award winning pop artist
- Jon Delano - journalist
- Scott Ferrall (born 1965) - radio personality
- Dave Filoni (born 1974) - President and director of Lucasfilm
- Rico Gagliano, journalist and podcaster
- Bob Hoag - record producer and recording artist
- David Hollander (born 1968) - actor and film producer
- Gillian Jacobs (born 1982) - actress
- Christine Laitta - actress
- Elena LaQuatra (born 1992) - journalist, television news anchor, and former beauty pageant titleholder
- Vince Lascheid (1923-2009) - Pittsburgh Pirates and Penguins organist
- Daniel London (born 1973) - actor
- Joe Manganiello (born 1976) - actor
- Matt McConnell (born 1963) - NHL play-by-play broadcaster, Utah Mammoth
- Terri Minsky (born 1957) - television writer, producer, creator of Disney's Lizzie McGuire and Andi Mack
- Judith O'Dea (born 1945) – actress
- Alby Oxenreiter - sportscaster
- Marty Pottenger - OBIE-award-winning playwright, performer, civic engagement artist, founder of Art At Work
- Amy Rigby - singer and songwriter
- Bill Roth (born 1964 or 1965) - Virginia Tech University play-by-play television announcer
- Martin Spitznagel (born 1982) - pianist
- Tom Stechschulte (1948-2021) - film and television actor
- Roma Torre (born 1958) - TV journalist and theater critic
- Art Tripp (born 1944) - percussionist for The Mothers of Invention and Captain Beefheart
- Bob Ufer (1920-1981) - University of Michigan play-by-play announcer
- Ming-Na Wen (born 1963) - actress

=== Government ===
- Kenyen Brown (born 1969 or 1970) - United States attorney
- Ruth Colker (born 1956) - scholar, lawyer, and distinguished professor
- Susan J. Crawford (born 1947) - lawyer
- Q. Todd Dickinson (1952-2020) - USC(IP) and USPTO director
- Dan Duggan - politician
- Wayne S. Ewing (1929-2010) - politician
- Timothy Hauser (1948–2005) - economist with the United States Department of Commerce and the Bureau of Labor Statistics; two time winner of the Presidential Rank Award of Distinguished Executive winner
- Patrick J. Hogan (born 1962) - politician and lobbyist
- E. Henry Knoche (1925-2010) - director of the Central Intelligence Agency (CIA)
- Dick Lamm (1935-2021) - former governor of Colorado and Presidential candidate
- Richard Pan (born 1965) - physician, politician, and California state senator
- James O'Toole - journalist and U.S. Capitol correspondent
- Lynn Scarlett (born 1948 or 1949) - government official, environmental policy executive and analyst who served as United States Deputy Secretary of the Interior
- Samuel A. Schreiner Jr. (1921-2018) - writer and cryptographer
- John Seymour (1937-2026)- politician
- Carole Beebe Tarantelli (born 1942) - Italian parliament member; first American citizen to be elected to the Italian Chamber of Duties
- Gerald Bard Tjoflat (born 1929) - lawyer and jurist serving as Senior United States circuit judge and in the US Court of Appeals in the eleventh circuit
- Doug Walgren (born 1940) politician; U.S. House of Representatives

=== Education ===
- Robert Bruegmann - distinguished professor of architecture at University of Illinois
- Edward Bleiberg (born 1951) - archaeologist and academic
- Peter Cappelli (born 1956) - economist, academic, author, and professor at the Wharton School
- Gwyn Cready (born 1962) - author
- Todd DePastino - author and history professor
- Christina Duhig - poet
- Sandra Moore Faber (born 1944) - world renowned astrophysicist, National Medal of Science recipient
- Greg Fenves (born 1957) - 21st President of Emory University and 28th President of the University of Texas
- James Ferrell (born 1955) - Stanford University biologist
- Albert Goldman (1927-1994) author and academic
- Terry Hart (born 1946) - former NASA astronaut and engineer
- Stuart A. Herrington (born 1972 or 1971) - author and retired counterintelligence officer
- Paige Kassalen (born 1993) – Electrical engineer who was the only American, female engineer, and youngest member of the ground crew for the Solar Impulse 2 project
- Dan Klein (born c.1976) - computer science professor
- Caroline Klivans (born 1977) - mathematician
- Brian McHale (1952-2025) - literary scholar, Ohio State University distiguished professor
- Linn F. Mollenauer (1937–2021) - physicist and author
- Reed E. Pyeritz (1947-2026) - geneticist, physician, and academic
- Anson D. Shupe (1948-2015) - sociologist, author, academic, and professor
- Warner Slack, professor at Harvard University, physician, biomedical informatician, and pioneer in medical informatics
- Ann M. Valentine (born 1971 or 1972) - Yale University bioinorganic chemist and researcher
- Julia Randall Weertman, materials scientist, academic, Northwestern University professor
- Aidan Wright - professor, scholar, and researcher

=== Other ===
- Richard Baumhammers (born 1965) - spree killer and former immigration lawyer
- Newt Heisley - commercial artist and designer of the POW/MIA flag
- William D. Morgan (1947-1969) - U.S. Marine and Medal of Honor recipient
- Michael Turian - Professional Magic: The Gathering player

== Notable staff ==
- Orlando Antigua (born 1973) - basketballer
- Joe David - basketball executive and investor; president of Pistoia Basket 2000
- Tom Donahoe, NFL executive and general manager
- Ralph Fife (1920-2000) - NFL football player and coach
- Freddie Fu (1950-2021) - doctor, surgeon, and academic
- Armen Gilliam (1964-2011) - basketballer
- Brett McCutcheon - composer and music educator
- Mauro Monz - football player and coach
- Bob Palko - American football coach
- George Savarese (born 1965) - radio personality and educator
- Jamie Silva - NFL football player
- Paul Tortorella (born 1963) - football coach
- Reggie Wells - football coach
