= List of people from Mt. Lebanon, Pennsylvania =

The following is a list of people who are natives of, have lived in or have been associated with Mt. Lebanon, Pennsylvania.

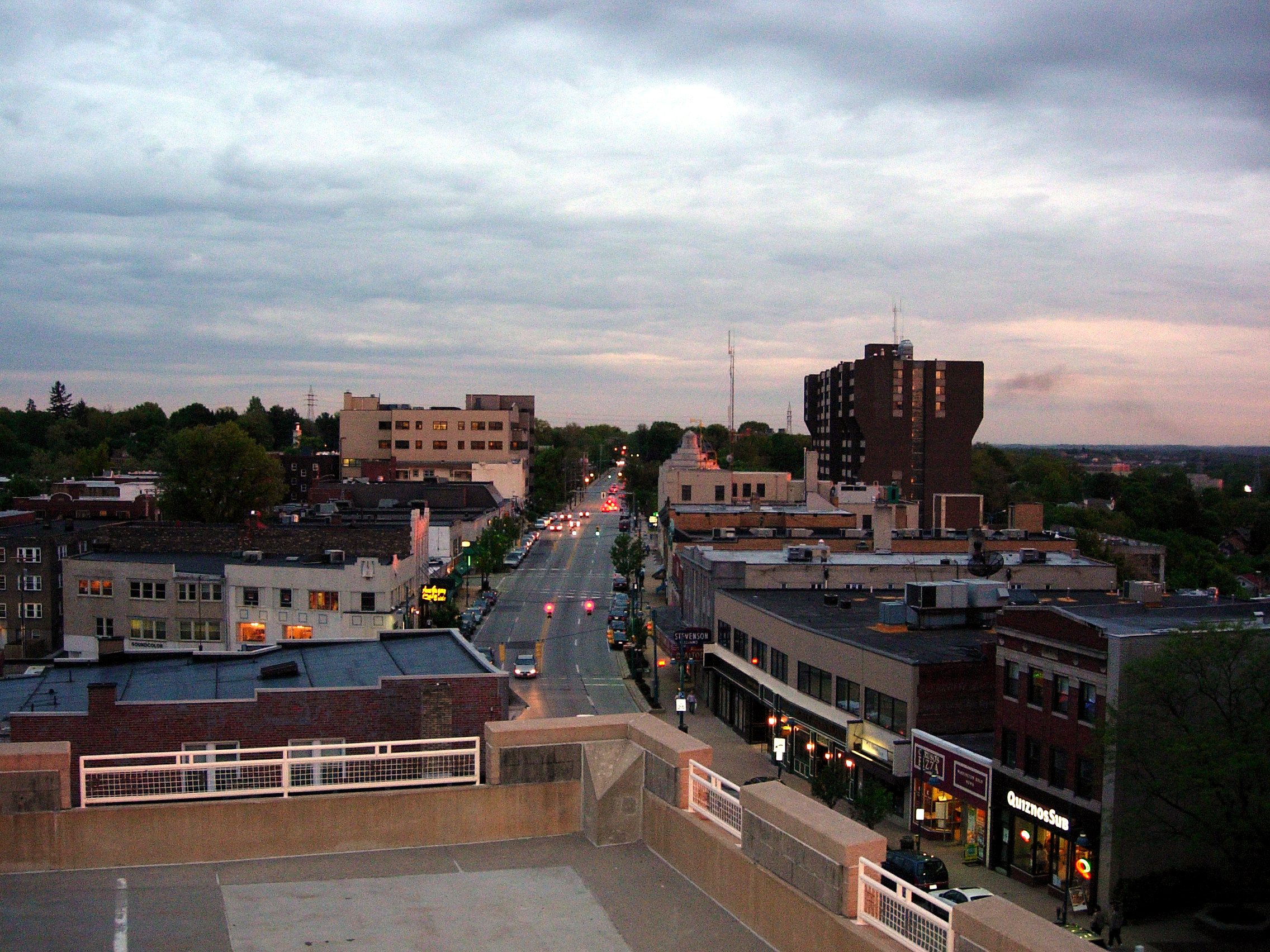
Uptown Mt. Lebanon along Washington Road

== Athletics ==
- Eric Angle, professional wrestler
- Kurt Angle, Olympic gold medalist in freestyle wrestling and former professional wrestler
- Orlando Antigua, basketball player and coach
- Steve Apke, NFL football player
- Troy Apke, NFL cornerback and special teamer
- Matt Bartkowski, NHL ice hockey defenseman
- David Bednar, MLB pitcher and all-star
- Mia Bhuta, soccer player
- Rocky Bleier, NFL football player
- Gene Breen, NFL football player
- Mike Cawley, CFL football player
- Ralph Cindrich, NFL football player and sports agent
- Paul Coffey, NHL hockey player and Hall of Fame
- Kevin Constantine, NHL hockey coach
- Myron Cope, sports broadcaster, journalist, and radio personality
- Ave Daniell, football tackle
- Jim Daniell, NFL football player
- Bill Davidson, NFL football player
- Tom Donahoe, NFL executive and general manager
- Bill Dutton, NFL football player
- Ralph Fife, NFL football player and coach
- John Fitsioris - professional basketball player
- John E. Frank, NFL football player and surgeon
- Larry Foust, NBA basketball player
- Dave Giusti, MLB baseball player
- Frank Gustine, MLB baseball player
- Justin Geisinger, NFL football player
- Armen Gilliam, basketball player and coach
- Curt Grieve, college football player
- Jim Haney, college basketball coach, former University of Oregon head coach
- Ian Happ, MLB player
- Eli Heidenreich, NFL player
- Jaromir Jagr, NHL hockey player, fourth most goals scored in league history
- Chris Jelic, MLB baseball player
- Tom Jelley, NFL football player
- Donald Johnson, professional tennis player
- Landry Jones, NFL football player
- Don T. Kelly, MLB player and coach
- Omar Khan, Pittsburgh Steelers General Manager
- Nellie King, MLB baseball player, Pittsburgh Pirates announcer
- Austin Kitchen MLB baseball player
- Dan Kovacs, powerlifter
- John-Henry Krueger, Olympic speedskater
- Rich Lackner, football coach
- Mario Lemieux, NHL hockey player and hall of famer
- Jim Leyland, former MLB baseball player, coach and manager
- Roberta McCallum, professional tennis player
- John O'Hara, professional soccer player
- Rick Peterson, baseball coach and former pitcher
- Art Rooney Sr, NFL football executive, founder of the Pittsburgh Steelers franchise
- Art Rooney Jr, NFL football executive, Vice President of the Pittsburgh Steelers
- Art Rooney II, NFL football executive, owner and President of the Pittsburgh Steelers
- Gretchen Rush, professional tennis player
- Richard Rydze, Olympic diver and doctor
- Colby Sorsdal, NFL offensive lineman
- David Shields, MLB baseball player
- Neal Shipley, professional golfer
- Jamie Silva, NFL football player
- Brian Simmons, MLB baseball player
- Leah Smith, Olympic swimmer
- Paul Steigerwald, sportscaster
- Luke Stout, former Princeton Tigers wrestler and Ivy League Champion
- Mac Stout, Pitt Panthers and ACC champion wrestler
- Bill Stull, college football quarterback
- Alex Tecza, NFL football running back
- Anna Tunnicliffe Tobias, Olympic sailor
- Paul Tortorella, football coach
- Rick Tocchet, NHL hockey player and coach, Philadelphia Flyers head coach
- Andrew Toole, college basketball head coach
- Deion Turman - professional basketball player
- Brian S. Williams, NFL football center
- Josh Wilson, MLB player
- Patrick Wey, NHL hockey player
- Frank N. Wolf, college basketball coach
- Fritzie Zivic, professional boxer

== Business ==
- Carol Brown, businesswoman and arts administrator
- Donald C. Burnham, businessman and Westinghouse Corporation Executive
- Carolyn M. Byham, philanthropist and community activist
- William C. Byham, philanthropist, entrepreneur, psychologist
- Mark Cuban, billionaire, entrepreneur, media personality, Dallas Mavericks owner
- Brian Cuban, attorney and author
- David C. Farrell, businessman, retail executive, and philanthropist, former president of Kaufman's and May Department Stores
- Joseph Hardy, billionaire, businessman, philanthropist, founder of 84 Lumber and Nemacolin Woodlands resort
- Thomas Finke, investor, executive, businessman, former president of MassMutual and CEO of Barings LLC
- Andrew Mason, founder and former CEO of Groupon
- Robert W. Lucky, electrical engineer, inventor, and entrepreneur
- Joel Peresman, music industry executive, president and chief executive officer of the Rock and Roll Hall of Fame Foundation
- Rich Skrenta, computer programmer and tech entrepreneur, co-founder of Blekko, creator of Elk Cloner virus
- John P. Surma, businessman, former CEO of US Steel, minority owner of Pittsburgh Penguins
- Bob Truel, computer programmer and tech entrepreneur, co-founder of Blekko

== Education ==
- Ellen Berliner, activist and Alzheimers disease researcher
- Robert Bruegmann - distinguished professor of architecture at University of Illinois
- Edward Bleiberg (born 1951) - archaeologist and academic
- Howard J. Burnett, former president of Washington & Jefferson College
- Peter Cappelli, economist, academic, author, and professor at the Wharton School
- Edward Constant II, historian and professor
- Gerald Costanzo, poet and publisher at Carnegie Mellon University
- Gwyn Cready, author
- Todd DePastino, author and history professor
- Christina Duhig, poet
- Sandra Moore Faber, world renowned astrophysicist, National Medal of Science recipient
- Greg Fenves, 21st President of Emory University and 28th President of the University of Texas
- Freddie Fu, doctor, academic, and surgeon
- Albert Goldman, bestselling author and academic
- Terry Hart, former NASA astronaut and engineer
- Stuart A. Herrington, author and retired counterintelligence officer
- Mansur Kamaletdinov, ballet dancer and choreographer
- Paige Kassalen, Electrical engineer who was the only American, female engineer, and youngest member of the ground crew for the Solar Impulse 2 project
- Dan Klein, computer science professor
- Caroline Klivans, mathematician
- Truman Kohman, Carnegie-Mellon University emeritus professor of nuclear chemistry who co-discovered aluminium-26 and the 4177 Kohman asteroid
- Ching Chun Li, Chinese-American human geneticist
- Carol Los Mansmann, judge and Duquesne University professor
- Brian McHale, literary scholar, Ohio State University distiguished professor
- Linn F. Mollenauer, physicist and author
- Reed E. Pyeritz, geneticist, physician, and academic
- George Savarese, radio personality and educator
- Peter Safar, cardiopulmonary specialist, pioneer and creator of modern CPR
- William Edward Sell, former Dean of Law at the University of Pittsburgh
- Anson D. Shupe, sociologist, author, academic, and professor
- Warner Slack, professor at Harvard University, physician, biomedical informatician, and pioneer in medical informatics
- Ann M. Valentine, Yale University bioinorganic chemist and researcher
- Julia Randall Weertman, materials scientist, academic, Northwestern University professor
- Aidan Wright, professor, scholar, and researcher

== Entertainment & Media ==
- Pierce Askegren, Marvel comic author
- Eugenie Baird, jazz singer
- Chloe Barlow, author
- Carl Betz, actor
- Gloria Bigelow, comedian and actress
- Shane Black, screenwriter and director
- Patti Burns, journalist and TV news anchor
- Frank Cappelli, actor and singer
- Twink Caplan, actress
- Christina Cindrich, actress and television host
- Daya, Grammy award winning pop artist
- Jon Delano, journalist
- Scott Ferrall, radio personality
- Dave Filoni, President and director of Lucasfilm
- Michael Fimognari, cinematographer and director
- Rico Gagliano, journalist and podcaster
- Matt Kennedy Gould, former American television personality and current basketball coach
- Marty Griffin, investigative reporter and talk show journalist
- Jay Hart, Hollywood set director
- Bob Hoag, record producer and recording artist
- David Hollander, actor and film producer
- Gillian Jacobs, actress
- Christine Laitta, actress
- Elena LaQuatra, journalist, television news anchor, and former beauty pageant titleholder
- Vince Lascheid, Pittsburgh Pirates and Penguins organist
- Mark Livolsi, film editor
- Daniel London, actor
- Joe Manganiello, actor
- Aarti Mann, actress in The Big Bang Theory
- Matt McConnell, NHL play-by-play broadcaster, Utah Mammoth
- Terri Minsky, television writer, producer, creator of Disney's Lizzie McGuire and Andi Mack
- Christopher Moeller, writer and painter
- Caitlin O'Connor, actress, film producer, and model
- Judith O'Dea, actress
- Alby Oxenreiter, sportscaster, journalist, and newscaster
- Marty Pottenger, OBIE-award-winning playwright, performer, civic engagement artist, founder of Art At Work
- Amy Rigby, singer and songwriter
- Denis Roddy, journalist
- Bill Roth, Virginia Tech University play-by-play television announcer
- Sara Shepard, best-selling author and creator of Pretty Little Liars
- Harriet Shetler, founder of National Alliance on Mental Illness
- Martin Spitznagel, pianist
- Tom Stechschulte, film and television actor
- William Tenn, author
- Marie Torre, television personality and news anchor
- Roma Torre, TV journalist and theater critic
- Art Tripp, percussionist for The Mothers of Invention and Captain Beefheart
- Bob Ufer, University of Michigan play-by-play announcer
- Ming-Na Wen, Disney Channel actress, voice of Mulan in Disney's Mulan

== Government ==
- Max Baer, attorney and judge
- Kenyen Brown, United States attorney
- Ruth Colker, scholar, lawyer, and distinguished professor
- William Sheldrick Conover, member of the U.S. House of Representatives
- Susan J. Crawford, lawyer
- Q. Todd Dickinson, USC(IP) and USPTO director
- Michael Diven, politician
- James H. Duff, politician and former governor of Pennsylvania
- Wayne S. Ewing, politician
- Gregory Fajt, politician and state representative
- Peter F. Flaherty, mayor and attorney
- James G. Fulton, politician; U.S. House of Representatives
- Timothy Hauser, economist with the United States Department of Commerce and the Bureau of Labor Statistics; two time winner of the Presidential Rank Award of Distinguished Executive winner
- Patrick J. Hogan, politician and lobbyist
- Pam Iovino, politician
- E. Henry Knoche, former director of the CIA
- Conor Lamb, attorney and politician; U.S. House of Representatives
- Thomas F. Lamb, attorney and politician
- Dick Lamm, former governor of Colorado and Presidential candidate
- Sophie Masloff, politician, first female and first Jewish mayor of Pittsburgh
- Dan Miller, politician, former member of the Pennsylvania House of Representatives
- William S. Moorhead, politician
- Richard Pan, physician, politician, and California state senator
- James O'Toole, journalist and U.S. Capitol correspondent
- Dan M. Rooney, NFL football executive, former owner of the Pittsburgh Steelers, philanthropist, and U.S. Diplomat
- Rick Santorum, politician, attorney, congressman, and author
- Lynn Scarlett, government official, environmental policy executive and analyst who served as United States Deputy Secretary of the Interior
- Samuel A. Schreiner Jr., writer and cryptographer
- John Seymour, politician
- Matthew H. Smith, Pennsylvania Senator
- Carole Beebe Tarantelli, Italian parliament member; first American citizen to be elected to the Italian Chamber of Duties
- Ronald L. Thompson, politician
- Gerald Bard Tjoflat, lawyer and jurist serving as Senior United States circuit judge and in the US Court of Appeals in the eleventh circuit
- Chelsa Wagner, politician
- Doug Walgren, politician; U.S. House of Representatives

== Other ==
- Richard Baumhammers, spree killer and former immigration lawyer
- John Bazzano, mobster
- Tony Grosso, mobster and bookmaker
- Newt Heisley, commercial artist and designer of the POW/MIA flag
- Robert H. Meneilly, megachurch pastor
- William D. Morgan, U.S. Marine and Medal of Honor recipient
- Eleanor Smeal, women's rights activist
- Anne Steytler, activist and feminist
- Michael Turian, Professional Magic: The Gathering player
