= Mt. Lebanon School District =

School district in Pennsylvania, United States

Coordinates: 40.375°N 80.051°W

Location
- Mt. Lebanon, Pennsylvania United States

District information
- Type: Public School District
- Motto: To Provide the Best Education; Possible for Each and Every Student
- Grades: K–12
- Established: July 1912
- Superintendent: Dr. Melissa Friez
- Budget: $122.2 Million (24-25)

Students and staff
- Students: 5,500
- Teachers: 450
- Staff: 250
- Athletic conference: WPIAL
- Colors: Blue and Gold

Other information
- Website: http://www.mtlsd.org

The Mt. Lebanon School District is the public school system in Allegheny County for residents of Mt. Lebanon, Pennsylvania, a suburb of Pittsburgh, Pennsylvania. The district covers approximately 6.0 square miles, and serves a residential population of around 34,000 people.

Mt. Lebanon School District is organized into seven elementary schools for grades K–5 — Foster Elementary School, Hoover Elementary School, Howe Elementary School, Jefferson Elementary School, Lincoln Elementary School, Markham Elementary School, and Washington Elementary School. It also includes two middle schools, Jefferson Middle School and Andrew W. Mellon Middle School, serving grades 6–8, and Mt. Lebanon High School, which hosts grades 9–12.

The district borders six other school districts: Baldwin-Whitehall, Bethel Park, Chartiers Valley, Keystone Oaks, Pittsburgh Public Schools, and Upper St. Clair.

== History ==
=== First years of operation ===
The Mt. Lebanon School District was established by decree of the Court of Quarter Sessions in July 1912. With a five-member school board and a population of less than five thousand students, it was designated as a fourth-class district. The district initially encompassed two buildings—a one-room, frame structure that was located on Beadling Road and a six-room, frame structure that was located at the corner of Cedar Boulevard and Washington Road.

In 1913, a two-year agriculture course of studies was added to the Mt. Lebanon High School curriculum. In 1914, controversy arose when a group of parents of twelve children petitioned the Mt. Lebanon School Board to reimburse them for their children's tuition after they removed their children and re-enrolled them in the Pittsburgh city schools, citing their objection to the "Mt. Lebanon system" of education. According to The Pittsburgh Post, "Prominent among the features in the Mt. Lebanon system" was "the elimination of the periodical, stated examination on which promotions ordinary are based; an expressed tendency to permit each pupil to be his own pacemaker in school work; the elimination of night study and the individual observation of each pupil in order that the school may be fitted to his or her needs." In addition, according to that publication, "The present school term saw the organization of a new force of instructors—their predecessors having been relieved for want of adaptibility to the new system."

=== 1930s ===
During the early 1930s, H. V. Herlinger, the superintendent of the Mt. Lebanon School District, approved a "Cadet Teachers" plan to enable residents of Mt. Lebanon who were college graduates with state teaching certificates to receive two years of additional on-the-job training while working as temporary educators within the school district, with the promise that, if they successfully completed their training period and passed their required professional examinations, they would receive full-time teaching jobs at the end of their respective two-year cadet teacher training periods.

=== 1950s ===
In 1959, Mt. Lebanon High School was ranked among the top 44 high schools in the United States in a review of American school districts by educators from 120 colleges and universities. The faculty at that time included 3 educators with doctorate degrees, with 62 out of the high school's 75 educators holding master's degrees. Beginning educators were paid $4,200 annually while educators with doctorates earned $8,000 per year. Teachers who resided in Mt. Lebanon and had children of their own were also each awarded an additional $350 per year through the school district's cost of living allowance program for its staff. With a total enrollment of 2,242 students, the high school was home to 11 varsity sports teams and a 165-member band.

=== 1970s ===
In 1973, civil rights and social justice activists Ellen Berliner and Anne Steytler were part of a group of fifty parents, students and other community members who filed suit in the Common Pleas Court of Pennsylvania "to prohibit Mt. Lebanon School District from including prayers in its commencement exercises." Berliner's husband and daughter were also two of the plaintiffs.

=== 1990s ===
In 1998, the Mt. Lebanon School District was presented with two Blue Ribbon Awards by the United States Department of Education, as well as special Blue Ribbon Award for being the home of one of the eight best fine arts programs in America.

=== 2000s ===
In September 2009, the enrollment at Mt. Lebanon School District was 5,302, the per-pupil cost of education was $13,745 per child for that academic year, there was a teacher student ratio of 23.04 to 1 (district average), and 96 percent of students planned on pursuing "full-time or Armed Service education." The beginning salary for a teacher with a bachelor's degree was $43,989 and for a teacher with a master's degree plus 60 credits was $96,420. Seventy-seven percent of the school's faculty held master's degrees or higher.

== Schools ==
- High School: Mt. Lebanon High School
- Middle Schools: Jefferson Middle School, Mellon Middle School
- Elementary Schools: Foster Elementary School, Hoover Elementary School, Howe Elementary School, Jefferson Elementary School, Lincoln Elementary School, Markham Elementary School, Washington Elementary School

== Facilities ==
=== High School ===
==== Academic & Instructional Facilities ====
- Library and media center
- Full production digital media and television studio
- Multiple computer labs
- Writing labs
- Science wing
- Child development labs
- Food and nutrition labs
- Applied engineering and graphics labs
- Multiple biology and chemistry research labs
- Outdoor greenhouse
- Solar Flower
- Mathematics Lab

==== Athletic Facilities ====
- Three full-size gymnasiums
- Indoor swimming pool
- Athletic weight room
- Six tennis courts
- 7,200-seat stadium
- Three synthetic turf multi purpose fields
- Synthetic running track
- Grass baseball field
- Two synthetic turf baseball fields
- Outdoor swimming pool
- Three indoor tennis courts
- Two ice rinks
- Pickleball courts
- Bocce courts
- Sand volleyball courts
- Two outdoor basketball courts
- Platform tennis courts
- Recreation Center
- Two wrestling rooms

==== Fine Arts & Media Facilities ====
- Main auditorium
- Two theaters
- Visual arts studios
- Two professional dance studios
- Choral rooms
- Music studios
- Practice rooms
- Full production digital media and television studio

== Notable alumni ==
=== Athletics ===
- Eric Angle (born 1967) - professional wrestler
- Kurt Angle (born 1968) - Olympic gold medalist in freestyle wrestling and former professional wrestler
- Troy Apke (born 1995) - NFL cornerback and special teamer
- Matt Bartkowski (born 1988) - NHL ice hockey defenseman
- Mia Bhuta (born 2005) - soccer player
- Gene Breen (born 1941) - NFL football player
- Ave Daniell (1914-1999) - football tackle
- Jim Daniell (1918-1983) - NFL football player
- Bill Davidson (1915-1970) - NFL football player
- John Fitsioris - professional basketball player
- John E. Frank (born 1962) - NFL football player and surgeon
- Justin Geisinger, NFL football player
- Curt Grieve, college football player
- Ian Happ (born 1994) - MLB player
- Eli Heidenreich (born 2003) - NFL player
- Chris Jelic (born 1963) - MLB baseball player
- Tom Jelley (1926–2014) - NFL football player
- Don T. Kelly (born 1980) - MLB player and coach
- Austin Kitchen (born 1997) - MLB baseball player
- Rich Lackner (born 1956) - football coach
- Roberta McCallum (born 1958) - professional tennis player
- John O'Hara (born 1959) - professional soccer player
- Rick Peterson (born 1954) - baseball coach and former pitcher
- Gretchen Rush (born 1964) - professional tennis player
- Richard Rydze (1950-2023) - Olympic diver and doctor
- David Shields (born 2006) - MLB baseball player
- Colby Sorsdal (born 2000) - NFL offensive lineman
- Alex Tecza - NFL football running back
- Deion Turman - professional basketball player
- Brian S. Williams (born 1966) - NFL football center
- Josh Wilson (born 1981) - MLB player
- Patrick Wey (born 1991) - NHL hockey player

=== Business ===
- Mark Cuban (born 1958) - billionaire entrepreneur
- Brian Cuban (born 1961) - attorney and author
- Andrew Mason (born 1981) - founder and former CEO of Groupon
- Rich Skrenta (born 1967) - computer programmer and tech entrepreneur, creator of Elk Cloner virus
- John P. Surma (born 1954) - businessman, former CEO of US Steel, minority owner of Pittsburgh Penguins
- Greg Fenves (born 1957) - 21st President of Emory University and 28th President of the University of Texas

=== Entertainment & Media ===
- Carl Betz (1921-1978) - actor
- Eugene Baird (1923-1988) - jazz singer
- Patti Burns (1952-2001) - journalist and TV news anchor
- Frank Capelli (1952-2018) - actor and singer
- Twink Caplan (born 1947) - actress
- Christina Cindrich (born 1981 or 1982) - actress and television host
- Daya (born 1998) - Grammy award winning pop artist
- Jon Delano - journalist
- Scott Ferrall (born 1965) - radio personality
- Dave Filoni (born 1974) - President and director of Lucasfilm
- Bob Hoag - record producer and recording artist
- David Hollander (born 1968) - actor and film producer
- Gillian Jacobs (born 1982) - actress
- Vince Lascheid (1923-2009) - Pittsburgh Pirates and Penguins organist
- Daniel London (born 1973) - actor
- Joe Manganiello (born 1976) - actor
- Matt McConnell (born 1963) - NHL play-by-play broadcaster, Utah Mammoth
- Terri Minsky (born 1957) - television writer, producer
- Judith O'Dea (born 1945) – actress
- Marty Pottenger - OBIE-award-winning playwright, performer, civic engagement artist, founder of Art At Work
- Amy Rigby - singer and songwriter
- Bill Roth (born 1964 or 1965) - Virginia Tech University play-by-play television announcer
- Roma Torre (born 1958) - TV journalist and theater critic
- Art Tripp (born 1944) - percussionist for The Mothers of Invention and Captain Beefheart
- Bob Ufer (1920-1981) - University of Michigan play-by-play announcer
- Ming-Na Wen (born 1963) - actress

=== Government ===
- Kenyen Brown (born 1969 or 1970) - United States attorney
- Ruth Colker (born 1956) - scholar, lawyer, and distinguished professor
- Susan J. Crawford (born 1947) - lawyer
- Q. Todd Dickinson (1952-2020) - USC(IP) and USPTO director
- Wayne S. Ewing (1929-2010) - politician
- Timothy Hauser (1948–2005) - economist with the United States Department of Commerce and the Bureau of Labor Statistics; two time winner of the Presidential Rank Award of Distinguished Executive winner
- Dick Lamm (1935-2021) - former governor of Colorado and Presidential candidate
- Lynn Scarlett (born 1948 or 1949) - government official, environmental policy executive and analyst who served as United States Deputy Secretary of the Interior
- John Seymour (1937-2026)- politician
- Carole Beebe Tarantelli (born 1942) - Italian parliament member; first American citizen to be elected to the Italian Chamber of Duties
- Gerald Bard Tjoflat (born 1929) - lawyer and jurist serving as Senior United States circuit judge and in the US Court of Appeals in the eleventh circuit

=== Education ===
- Gwyn Cready (born 1962) - author
- Todd DePastino - author and history professor
- Sandra Moore Faber (born 1944) - world renowned astrophysicist, National Medal of Science recipient
- Terry Hart (born 1946) - former NASA astronaut and engineer
- Stuart A. Herrington (born 1972 or 1971) - author and retired counterintelligence officer
- Paige Kassalen (born 1993) – Electrical engineer who was the only American, female engineer, and youngest member of the ground crew for the Solar Impulse 2 project
- Dan Klein (born c.1976) - computer science professor
- Caroline Klivans (born 1977) - mathematician
- Linn F. Mollenauer (1937–2021) - physicist and author
- Reed E. Pyeritz (1947-2026) - geneticist, physician, and academic
- Warner Slack, professor at Harvard University, physician, biomedical informatician, and pioneer in medical informatics
- Ann M. Valentine (born 1971 or 1972) - Yale University bioinorganic chemist and researcher
- Julia Randall Weertman, materials scientist, academic, Northwestern University professor

=== Other ===
- Richard Baumhammers (born 1965) - spree killer and former immigration lawyer
- Newt Heisley - commercial artist and designer of the POW/MIA flag
- William D. Morgan (1947-1969) - U.S. Marine and Medal of Honor recipient
- Michael Turian - Professional Magic: The Gathering player

== Notable staff ==
- Orlando Antigua (born 1973) - basketballer
- Ralph Fife (1920-2000) - NFL football player and coach
- Freddie Fu (1950-2021) - doctor, surgeon, and academic
- Armen Gilliam (1964-2011) - basketballer
- George Savarese (born 1965) - radio personality and educator
- Jamie Silva - NFL football player
- Paul Tortorella (born 1963) - football coach
