= Thine Is the Glory =

Thine Is the Glory can refer to:

- "Thine Is the Glory" (hymn), a 1923 English hymn based on the 1884 French hymn "A Toi la Gloire" set to music from Handel's Judas Maccabaeus
- Thine Is the Glory: A Novel of America's Golden Triangle, a 1975 novel by Samuel A. Schreiner, Jr. about a family in Pittsburgh
