= James Ferrell (biologist) =

American biologist (born 1955)

James E. Ferrell
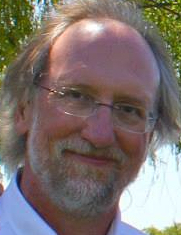
- Born: November 3, 1955 (age 70)
- Education: Stanford University, Williams College
- Title: Professor of Chemical and Systems Biology
- Scientific career
- Workplaces: Stanford University School of Medicine
- Website: James E. Ferrell Lab at Stanford

James Ellsworth Ferrell (born November 3, 1955) is an American systems biologist. He is a Professor of Chemical and Systems Biology and Biochemistry at Stanford University School of Medicine. He was Chair of the Dept. of Chemical and Systems Biology from its inception in 2006 until 2011.

== Early life ==
Ferrell was raised in the Chicago and Pittsburgh areas before graduating from Mt. Lebanon High School in 1972.

== Education ==
Ferrell was an undergraduate at Williams College, majoring in Physics, Chemistry, and Mathematics, and graduated in 1976. He received his Ph.D. degree in chemistry from Stanford University in 1984 for work in the laboratory of Wray H. Huestis on the control of red cell shape, and received his M.D. degree from Stanford in 1986. He carried out postdoctoral work on signal transduction in the laboratory of G. Steven Martin at UC Berkeley.

== Research ==
Through studies of Xenopus laevis oocyte maturation, Ferrell showed how graded changes in the inductive stimulus progesterone are converted into irreversible, all-or-none changes in MAP kinase activity, cyclin-dependent kinase activity, and cell fate. These studies helped demonstrate how ultrasensitivity, positive feedback, and bistability can allow cells to switch between discrete states.

Subsequent work from the Ferrell lab and others demonstrated that the cell cycle transition between interphase and mitosis is regulated by a bistable switch, and that the Xenopus early embryonic cell cycle operates like a relaxation oscillator. These findings helped validate earlier theoretical predictions and modeling studies.

Recently the Ferrell lab showed that the mitotic state can propagate through Xenopus cytoplasm via trigger waves, waves of Cdk1 activity that spread faster and farther than the Cdk1 protein molecules can diffuse. They also showed that apoptosis propagates through cytoplasm by trigger waves; the "speed of death" is about 2 mm per hour.
