= Mac Stout =

American wrestler

Personal information
- Nationality: American
- Home town: Mt. Lebanon, Pennsylvania, U.S.
- Weight: 197 lb (89 kg)

Sport
- Sport: Wrestling
- Weight class: 197 lb
- Event: Freestyle
- College team: Pittsburgh Panthers

Maclane Stout is an American colliegate wrestler who competes for the University of Pittsburgh Panthers at 197 pounds. ` Stout became an NCAA Division I All-American in 2025 after placing seventh at 197 pounds, and won the 197-pound title at the ACC Wrestling Championships in 2025.

== Early life and high school career ==
Stout attended Mt. Lebanon High School in Mt. Lebanon, Pennsylvania. He compiled a 133–17 record during his high school career and recorded 63 victories by fall. He was a two-time Pennsylvania state medalist and won WPIAL championships as a sophomore and senior.

As a sophomore, Stout finished second at 170 pounds at the PIAA Class 3A Wrestling Championships. As a senior, he placed third at 189 pounds. He missed the 2021 postseason after suffering an injury at the Powerade Tournament.

== College career ==
=== 2022–23 ===
Stout redshirted during the 2022–23 season and finished with an 8–3 record. He won the 197-pound title at the Clarion Open in his first collegiate tournament and later competed at the Midlands Championships.

=== 2023–24 ===
Stout became Pittsburgh's starting 197-pound wrestler during the 2023–24 season. He finished the season with a 23–8 record and qualified for the NCAA Championships after placing third at the ACC Championships.

At the 2024 NCAA Championships, Stout advanced to the round of 16. During the season, he recorded victories over ranked opponents including Luke Surber of Oklahoma State University and Luke Geog of Ohio State University.

=== 2024–25 ===
Stout's sophomore season was his most successful to that point. He finished with a 27–4 record and won the 197-pound ACC championship, defeating Stanford's Nikolas Stemmet 10–2 in the final.

At the 2025 NCAA Division I Wrestling Championships, Stout was seeded sixth at 197 pounds.

During the tournament, Stout defeated his older brother, Luke Stout, in the second round. Their match marked the first time brothers had wrestled against one another at the NCAA Division I Wrestling Championships. Stout earned All-American honors by reaching the podium and finished seventh at 197 pounds. He defeated Wyatt Voelker of Northern Iowa to clinch All-American status before defeating Nebraska's Camden McDaniel in the seventh-place bout.

Stout won the 197-pound championship at the 2024 Midlands Championships, defeating Indiana's Gabe Sollars 13–9 in the final.

=== 2025–26 ===
Stout returned to Pittsburgh's lineup at 197 pounds during the 2025–26 season. He finished third at the ACC Championships and qualified for the NCAA Championships for the third consecutive year.

During the season, Stout won the 197-pound title at the Navy Classic and defeated multiple ranked opponents. Among his notable victories was a 20–4 technical fall over Nebraska's Camden McDaniel in the Navy Classic final.

At the 2026 ACC Wrestling Championships, Stout entered the tournament as the returning 197-pound ACC champion and was seeded second.

== Academic career and honors ==
Stout has been named to the Atlantic Coast Conference All-Academic Team and was recognized as an NWCA Scholar All-American in 2025. He was again named to the All-ACC Academic Team in 2026 while studying Media & Professional Communications at Pittsburgh.

In 2025, Stout was selected as the Pittsburgh Panthers' Choice Awards Male Athlete of the Year.

== Personal life ==
Stout's older brothers, Kellan and Luke, also competed in collegiate wrestling. Kellan wrestled at Penn State before transferring to Pittsburgh and qualifying for the NCAA Championships, while Luke competed for Princeton University.

Stout his brother Luke faced each other at the 2025 NCAA Division I Wrestling Championships, becoming the first brothers to face each other in the history of NCAA wrestling.

== Career record ==
| Season | Weight | Record | NCAA | ACC |
|---|---|---|---|---|
| 2022–23 | 197 lb | 8–3 | — | — |
| 2023–24 | 197 lb | 23–8 | Round of 16 | 3rd |
| 2024–25 | 197 lb | 27–4 | 7th | 1st |
| 2025–26 | 197 lb | 21–6 | 2–2 | 3rd |
| Career | | 79–21 | | |

== Awards and honors ==
- 2025 NCAA Division I All-American
- 2025 ACC champion at 197 pounds
- 2025 All-ACC
- 2025 NWCA Scholar All-American
- 2025 Pittsburgh Panthers' Choice Awards Male Athlete of the Year
- 2025 Midlands Championships champion at 197 pounds
- 2025–26 All-ACC Academic Team
- Three-time NCAA qualifier (2024, 2025, 2026)
