= Michael P. Schaefer =

American politician

John M. Schaefer

Member of the Pennsylvania Senate from the 37th district
- In office January 4, 1977 – November 30, 1980
- Preceded by: Wayne Ewing
- Succeeded by: Mike Fisher

Personal details
- Born: March 25, 1938 San Diego, California, United States
- Party: Democrat
- Children: Derek Schaefer and Michael Schaefer
- Education: University of Notre Dame; Georgetown University Law Center
- Occupation: Attorney
- Website: http://www.boe.ca.gov/schaefer/

Michael P. Schaefer (April 30, 1946 – January 21, 2013) was a member of the Pennsylvania State Senate, serving from 1977 to 1980. He died January 21, 2013.
