= Peter Cappelli =

21st-century American economist

- Born: September 7, 1956 (age 70); New York
- Education: Cornell University; Oxford University
- Occupations: Author, Researcher, Management Professor, Human Resources Consultant
- Known for: Human Resources, Talent Management
- Website: mgmt.wharton.upenn.edu/profile/cappelli/

Peter Cappelli (born September 7, 1956) is a human resources and management academic and author. He is a professor of Management and director of the Center for Human Resources at the Wharton School of the University of Pennsylvania.

His research focusses on hiring and training practices, automated recruiting, employee retention, employee performance and talent management. His works are known for contextualizing and chronicling the evolution of employment landscape in the US.

== Early life and education ==
Peter Cappelli was born in Upstate New York and raised in Mt. Lebanon, Pennsylvania. His brother, Frank Cappelli, was an actor, musician, and host of Cappelli & Company, which aired on WTAE. He and his brother both graduated from Mt. Lebanon High School.

In 1978, he received a Bachelor of Science in industrial relations from Cornell University, and joined University of Oxford as a Fulbright Scholar, where he earned Doctorate in Labor Economics in 1980. He is a German Marshall Fund fellow, a research associate of National Bureau of Economic Research (Cambridge, Massachusetts) and a guest scholar at the Brookings Institution.

== Academic career ==
Cappelli joined the Wharton School in 1985 and served as the chair of its Management Department from 1995 to 1999.

He has penned over 150 research titles. In 2012, he released a book on Why Good People Can't Get Jobs as a follow-up to his opinion piece in The Wall Street Journal that garnered industry reviews. Cappelli led an open forum titled “Unemployed or Unemployable” at the 2013 Davos Annual Meeting of the World Economic Forum.

His book, Will College Pay Off—A Guide to the Most Important Financial Decision You'll Ever Make, published in 2015, was discussed on CNBC Squawk Box, PBS Newshour, and reviewed by the Financial Times, The Guardian, and Quartz (publication).

Cappelli has been the academic director of Wharton Executive Education Advanced programs for 15 years and currently leads the TMI-Wharton Programs on Talent Management. In 2019, he designed an undergraduate course for the Wharton School on “How to be the boss” aimed at people in their 20s.

== Advisory and consulting ==
Cappelli has served on three committees of the National Academy of Sciences in 1997, 2000 and 2007. During senior Bush and Clinton administrations, he was the co-director of the National Centre on the Educational Quality of Workforce with Robert Zemsky for the US Department of Education. He was a member of WEF's Global Agenda Council on Employment, and a senior advisor for employment policy to the Kingdom of Bahrain between 2003 and 2005.

== Awards and recognition ==
Cappelli was elected as a fellow of the National Academy of Human Resources (2003), was named among the 25 most important people working in the area of human capital by Vault Rankings (2001), and received the PRO award from the International Association of Corporate and Professional Recruiters for contributions to the field of human resources (2009). He was ranked fifth in HR Magazine's Top 20 most influential international thinkers in HR.

== Selected works ==
- Talent on Demand: Managing Talent in an Age of Uncertainty (2008)
- The India Way: How India’s top business leaders are revolutionizing management (2010).
- Why Good People Can’t Get Jobs: The Skills Gap and What Companies Can do About It (2012).
- Will College Pay Off?: A Guide to the Most Important Financial Decision You'll Ever Make (2015).
- Why we love to hate HR, Harvard Business Review (2015).
- Fortune Makers: The Leaders Creating China’s Great Global Companies (2017).
- Why Bosses Should Stop Thinking of ‘A Players,’ ‘B Players’ and ‘C Players’, The Wall Street Journal, 19 February 2017.
- The Biggest Mistakes Companies Make with Hiring, The Wall Street Journal, 21 February 2019.
