= David C. Farrell =

American businessmen and retail executive

- Born: June 14, 1933; Chicago, Illinois, U.S.
- Died: June 5, 2023 (aged 89); Ladue, Missouri, U.S.
- Education: Antioch College (BA)
- Occupation: Businessman
- Employer: May Department Stores Company
- Known for: Chairman and CEO of May Department Stores Company
- Spouse: Betty Farrell

David C. Farrell (June 14, 1933 – June 5, 2023) was an American businessman, retail executive, and philanthropist who served as chairman and chief executive officer of the May Department Stores Company. He began his retail career at Kaufmann's in Pittsburgh, eventually becoming president of the company before moving to May's corporate headquarters in St. Louis. Farrell served as chairman and chief executive officer of May from 1985 until his retirement in 1998.

== Early life and education ==
Farrell was born on June 14, 1933, in Chicago, Illinois. He graduated from Mt. Lebanon High School in 1951 and attended Antioch College, graduating in 1956 with a Bachelor of Arts degree.

== Career ==
Farrell began his career in 1956 as a buyer at Kaufmann's, which was later acquired by the May Department Stores Company. He advanced up through a series of positions, including becoming a branch store general manager, merchandise manager, vice president and general merchandise manager before becoming president of Kaufmann's in 1969.

In 1969, Farrell also became a vice president of May Department Stores. He was elected to May's board of directors in 1974 and became president and chief operating officer in 1975. In 1979, he was named chief executive officer, and in 1985 he became chairman and chief executive officer.

During Farrell's time, May Department Stores expanded through several acquisitions of its existing retail operations including acquisitions of Woodward & Lothrop and John Wanamaker. In 1993, Los Angeles Times reported that Farrell was chairman and chief executive as the company prepared Jerome T. Loeb to eventually succeed him as chairman.

Farrell retired as chairman and chief executive officer of May Department Stores in 1998 after four decades with the company. Washington University would describe May under Farrell's leadership as one of the largest and most profitable department-store companies in the United States.

== Corporate and civic activities ==
Farrell served on the boards of several different corporations and civic organizations. His directorships included Emerson Electric and Ralston Purina. He was also involved with the Saint Louis Symphony Orchestra, Saint Louis Art Museum, Saint Louis Community Foundation and the St. Louis Area Council of the Boy Scouts of America.

He participated in civic fundraising campaigns in the St. Louis area, including efforts associated with the United Way, the Salvation Army and arts and educational organizations.

== Philanthropy ==
Following his retirement from May Department Stores, Farrell served on the Washington University in St. Louis Board of Trustees for more than two decades, where he later became an emeritus trustee.

In 2000, Farrell and his wife, Betty, together with the former May Department Stores Company, established the David C. and Betty Farrell Distinguished Professorship in Medicine at Washington University School of Medicine. The Farrells also provided a $5 million donation toward the university's campaign that went towards construction of the Farrell Learning and Teaching Center on the university's medical campus.

In 2006, Farrell and his wife received Washington University's Robert S. Brookings Award for their contributions to the university and the St. Louis community. In 2009, Farrell received the William Greenleaf Eliot Society's Search Award, described by the university as the society's highest honor.

== Death ==
Farrell died on June 5, 2023, at his home in Ladue, Missouri, at the age of 89. Washington University honored him as a former longtime trustee and noted his philanthropic contributions to the university's medical school.
