= PIAA =

PIAA may refer to:

- Pennsylvania Interscholastic Athletic Association
- PIAA Corporation, an automobile parts and supplies manufacturer
