= Thomas Finke =

American investor and executive

Thomas Michael Finke is an American financial-services executive and investor. He has held senior positions in the banking and investment-management industries, including chairman and chief executive officer of Barings LLC and Babson Capital Management. He also served as executive vice president and chief investment officer of MassMutual.

== Early life and education ==
After graduating from Mt. Lebanon High School in Mt. Lebanon, Pennsylvania, Finke earned a bachelor's degree in commerce from the University of Virginia's McIntire School of Commerce and a Master of Business Administration from Duke University's Fuqua School of Business.

== Career ==
Finke began his career in the financial-services industry, working in high-yield and loan-syndication activities. He then held positions with Bear Stearns, Mellon Bank, and First Union Capital.

In 1998, Finke co-founded First Union Institutional Debt Management, where the company specialized in institutional investment management in high-yield loans. First Union later became part of Wachovia, and the business was acquired by Babson Capital Management in 2002. Finke joined Babson Capital following the acquisition.

In 2008, he became chairman and chief executive officer of Babson Capital Management and executive vice president and chief investment officer of its parent company, Massachusetts Mutual Life Insurance Company.

Under Finke, Babson Capital expanded its investment-management operations internationally. The World Economic Forum reported that the company had more than $212 billion in assets under management and operations in the United States, Europe, Australia and Southeast Asia under his leadership.

In 2016, Finke became chairman and chief executive officer of Barings LLC following the combination of Babson Capital Management with other MassMutual investment businesses. During his career at Barings, Finke also served as chairman of Cornerstone Real Estate Advisers and as a director of Wood Creek Capital Management, both of which were associated with Barings.

== Professional organizations ==
Finke was a founding member of the board of directors of the Loan Syndications and Trading Association (LSTA). He was also a founding board member of the Structured Finance Industry Group.

He has participated in discussions and conferences concerning institutional investing, leveraged loans, structured finance, infrastructure investment, and financial markets.

== Other ventures ==
Following his tenure as chief executive of Barings, Finke continued to serve on different corporate boards and as an adviser. He served as executive chairman of Aimia Inc. from 2023 to 2025.

In 2025, Finke was appointed to the board of Venu Holding Corporation, a company involved in live-music and hospitality venues.

Finke has served on corporate and nonprofit boards and advisory bodies. His affiliations have included the advisory board of the Belk School of Business at UNC Charlotte, Davidson College's Capital Campaign Committee, and the Investment Committee of the Roman Catholic Diocese of Charlotte.
