= Alby Oxenreiter =

American sportscaster

- Born: Pittsburgh, Pennsylvania, U.S.
- Education: Villanova University
- Occupation: Sportscaster
- Employer: WPXI

Alby Oxenreiter is an American sportscaster who has been the sports director and a main sports anchor for WPXI-TV since 2006. He previously worked as a sportscaster and reporter in Colorado and Pennsylvania, including positions at WTAE-TV and WPGH-TV.

== Early life and education ==
A native of Pittsburgh, he attended Villanova University after graduating from Mt. Lebanon High School in 1978, where he earned a Bachelor of Arts degree in communications.

While at Villanova, Oxenreiter became involved with the university's student radio station and newspaper. He worked as a play-by-play announcer and developed an interest in broadcasting and journalism. In 1982, after graduating, he won a KDKA-AM promotional contest to call a Pittsburgh Pirates game, an experience he later described as an important early step in his broadcasting career.

== Broadcasting career ==
Oxenreiter began his professional television career as a sportscaster in Grand Junction, Colorado, and as a sports anchor and reporter in and around Harrisburg, Wilkes-Barre, and Scranton. He later returned to Pittsburgh, where he worked for WTAE-TV and WPGH-TV.

In January 2006, Oxenreiter joined WPXI-TV as a member of its sports department. He later became the station's sports director and a principal sports anchor for Channel 11 News and its newscast on Fox 53.

During his career in Pittsburgh, Oxenreiter has covered the city's major professional sports teams, including the Pittsburgh Steelers, Pittsburgh Penguins and Pittsburgh Pirates. With WPXI, he has also covered multiple Super Bowls, Stanley Cup championships and major golf championships.

== Awards and recognition ==
Oxenreiter has received four Golden Quill Awards from the Press Club of Western Pennsylvania, as well as awards from the Associated Press. He has also received a Mid-Atlantic Emmy Award for Outstanding Individual Achievement in Sports Reporting.

At the 2017 Mid-Atlantic Emmy Awards, Oxenreiter won the "Talent – Anchor – Sports" category. He was also listed in the same category among the nominees for the 2019 Mid-Atlantic Emmy Awards.

Oxenreiter received the Ethos Award from the Villanova Communication Honor Society for character, excellence in communications and community service.

In 2017, Oxenreiter and WPXI colleague Dean Iampietro received the Golden Quill Award for Sports Television for their work on coverage of the Pittsburgh Penguins' 2017 Stanley Cup championship.

== Community involvement ==
Oxenreiter has participated in different charitable and community organizations around the Pittsburgh region. He has worked with the Multiple Sclerosis Service Society, United Cerebral Palsy, the Southwestern Pennsylvania Chapter of the American Cancer Society, the Arthritis Foundation of Western Pennsylvania and other organizations.

He has also served as a member of the Champions Committee of the Heinz History Center's Western Pennsylvania Sports Museum and has been involved with events benefiting Cardinal Wright Regional School and Pittsburgh-area Catholic schools. He is a co-author of Sports Memories of Western Pennsylvania.

== Personal life ==
Oxenreiter and his wife Karen reside in Mt. Lebanon, Pennsylvania, where they have three children.
