= Elena LaQuatra =

American news anchor and journalist

- Born: January 27, 1992 (age 34)
- Education: Point Park University
- Occupations: Journalist, television anchor, pageant titleholder
- Years active: 2015–present
- Employer: WTAE-TV
- Title: Miss Pennsylvania USA 2016
- Spouse: Jordan

Elena LaQuatra is an American journalist, television news anchor, and former beauty pageant titleholder. She is a morning news anchor at WTAE-TV in Pittsburgh, Pennsylvania, and was Miss Pennsylvania USA in 2016.

== Early life and education ==
LaQuatra was born and raised in Mt. Lebanon, Pennsylvania, and attended Mt. Lebanon High School.

At the age of four, LaQuatra contracted bacterial meningitis and lost her hearing abilities in both ears. She later received a cochlear implant and attended the DePaul School for Hearing and Speech, where she worked to develop her listening and spoken-language abilities.

As a teenager, LaQuatra began competing in pageants and won Miss Pennsylvania's Outstanding Teen in 2007 and Miss Pennsylvania Teen USA in 2010. In 2016, she won Miss Pennsylvania USA and represented Pennsylvania at Miss USA 2016.

LaQuatra attended Point Park University in Pittsburgh, where she studied broadcast communication and graduated in 2014. While attending Point Park, LaQuatra interned at KDKA-TV and WPXI where she went on to gain experience in television production and on-camera work.

== Pageantry ==
=== Miss Pennsylvania's Outstanding Teen ===
As a teenager, LaQuatra competed in the Miss America's Outstanding Teen system. She won the title of Miss Pennsylvania's Outstanding Teen in 2007 and went on to compete at the national competition, where she was a second runner-up.

=== Miss Pennsylvania Teen USA ===
In 2010, LaQuatra won the title of Miss Pennsylvania Teen USA. She went on to represent Pennsylvania at the Miss Teen USA 2010 competition.

=== Miss Pennsylvania USA ===
LaQuatra competed for the Miss Pennsylvania USA title in 2015, finishing as first runner-up. She returned the following year and won the title in December 2015, becoming Miss Pennsylvania USA 2016.

=== Miss USA 2016 ===
As Miss Pennsylvania USA, LaQuatra represented Pennsylvania at the Miss USA 2016 pageant in Las Vegas.

== Broadcasting career ==
LaQuatra began working at WTAE-TV in 2015 as a digital content creator for the station's 4 the 412 digital media project.

After working in digital media, she spent time reporting and anchoring at a television station in Erie, Pennsylvania. She returned to WTAE in 2018 as a general assignment reporter. She later go on to become a morning traffic anchor and noon news anchor for Pittsburgh's Action News 4.

In February 2026, WTAE announced that LaQuatra would become a co-anchor of Pittsburgh's Action News 4 This Morning, beginning March 2, 2026. She joined Janelle Hall and meteorologist Ashley Dougherty on the weekday morning broadcast.

== Advocacy and community work ==
LaQuatra has worked with organizations focused on hearing loss, education, and community service. She serves on the board of trustees of the DePaul School for Hearing and Speech and has served on the board of directors of the Eye & Ear Foundation of Pittsburgh.

The Eye & Ear Foundation described LaQuatra as profoundly deaf and a cochlear-implant user and described her experience with hearing loss as an influence her interest in its mission and her philanthropic work.

She has also served as an emcee for fundraising events and as an ambassador for nonprofit organizations.

In 2023, LaQuatra received the Great Alumni Award from Mt. Lebanon High School for her work as a journalist and involvement with nonprofit organizations.

== Personal life ==
LaQuatra is married to her husband Jordan, and they have a daughter.

== Awards and recognition ==
- Miss Pennsylvania's Outstanding Teen (2007)
- Miss Pennsylvania USA (2016)
- Pittsburgh Magazine 40 Under 40
- National Herald 40 Under 40
- Pittsburgh Business Times 30 Under 30
- ACHIEVA Yvonne Zanos Excellence in Media Award
- Girl Scouts Woman of Distinction in Journalism Award
