= Luke Stout =

American wrestler

Personal information
- Nationality: American
- Home town: Mt. Lebanon, Pennsylvania, U.S.
- Weight: 197 lb (89 kg)

Sport
- Sport: Wrestling
- Weight class: 197 lb
- Event: Freestyle
- College team: Princeton Tigers

Luke Stout is an American former collegiate wrestler who competed for the Princeton University Tigers at 197 pounds. Stout was a four-time NCAA Division I Wrestling Championships qualifier and the inaugural Ivy League champion at 197 pounds.

== Early life and high school career ==
Stout attended Mt. Lebanon High School in Mt. Lebanon, Pennsylvania. He compiled a 153–16 record during his high school career, including a state championship and a state runner-up finish.

Stout also competed successfully in national youth wrestling when he was younger, winning a cadet title at the Fargo wrestling tournament and a U16 national title. He also finished fifth in the junior competition at Fargo and seventh at the 2021 U23 national event.

== College career ==
=== 2021–22 ===
In his first collegiate season, Stout advanced to the final of the EIWA Championships and earned an automatic bid to the NCAA Championships. He entered the NCAA tournament as the No. 18 seed and defeated No. 15 seed Isaac Trumble of North Carolina State University in the opening round before losing to second-seeded Stephan Buchanan of Wyoming in the round of 16.

Stout finished his freshman season with a 20–7 record and went 8–2 in dual competition. He also won the Southeast Open and recorded victories over ranked opponents including Ohio State's Gavin Hoffman and Northwestern's Andrew Davison.

=== 2022–23 ===
During the 2022–23 season, Stout earned Second Team All-Ivy honors and qualified for the NCAA Championships after finishing third at the EIWA Championships.

He finished the season with a 21–10 record. Among his notable victories were wins over Michigan State's Cameron Caffey and Penn's Cole Urbas.

=== 2023–24 ===
Stout again earned Second Team All-Ivy honors and qualified for the NCAA Championships after placing sixth at the EIWA Championships.

He finished the season with a 21–7 record. During the regular season, Stout won the Navy Classic and finished second at the Midlands Championships.

At the 2024 NCAA Championships in Kansas City, Missouri, Stout went 1–2. He defeated Northwestern's Evan Bates before being eliminated from the tournament in the following round.

=== 2024–25 ===
Stout served as a captain of the Princeton wrestling team during his senior season.

He entered the inaugural Ivy League Wrestling Tournament as the No. 1 seed at 197 pounds. Stout defeated Harvard's Max Agresti by technical fall in the semifinals before defeating Cornell's Michael Dellagatta 20–5 by technical fall in the final to become the first Ivy League champion at 197 pounds.

Following the end of the season, Stout was named First Team All-Ivy. He finished the regular season with a 12–2 record and was ranked 18th nationally entering the Ivy League tournament. The Ivy League championship made Stout a four-time NCAA qualifier, making him the sixth wrestler in Princeton program history to qualify for the NCAA Championships in four seasons.

==== 2025 NCAA Championships ====
At the 2025 NCAA Division I Wrestling Championships in Philadelphia, Stout was the No. 11 seed at 197 pounds. Stout defeated Drexel's Mickey O'Malley 4–3 in the opening round.

In the second round, Luke and his younger brother, Mac Stout became the first brothers to face one another at the NCAA Division I Wrestling Championships, which date to the late 1920s. Mac won the match by a 4–2 decision. He finished his senior season with a 16–4 record.

== Post-collegiate career ==
Following his graduation from Princeton in 2025, Stout joined the Pittsburgh wrestling program as a graduate assistant. In that role, he worked with the team's heavier wrestlers, including his younger brother Mac.

== Personal life ==
His father, Bryan Stout, was a four-time All-American wrestler at Clarion University of Pennsylvania. His older brother Kellan wrestled for Penn State University and the University of Pittsburgh.

== Awards and honors ==
- Four-time NCAA qualifier (2022, 2023, 2024, 2025)
- 2025 Ivy League champion at 197 pounds
- 2025 First Team All-Ivy
- 2022 Second Team All-Ivy
- 2023 Second Team All-Ivy
- 2024 Second Team All-Ivy
- 2023 EIWA Academic Award
- 2024–25 Princeton wrestling team captain
