= Joel Peresman =

American music industry executive

- Born: Pittsburgh, Pennsylvania, U.S.
- Education: University of Texas at Austin
- Years active: 1978–present

Joel Peresman is an American music industry executive who has served as president and chief executive officer of the Rock and Roll Hall of Fame Foundation. He has previously held senior positions at William Morris Agency, Madison Square Garden, and Clear Channel Entertainment.

== Early life and education ==
Peresman was born in Pittsburgh, Pennsylvania. He graduated from Mt. Lebanon High School in 1974 and attended the University of Texas at Austin, where he earned a degree in finance.

Peresman developed an interest in the music business while attending college. During summer breaks in Pittsburgh, he worked for concert promoter Rich Engler, initially serving as security at concerts. He also volunteered with the television program Austin City Limits while attending the University of Texas.

== Career ==
After graduating from college in 1978, Peresman moved to New York City and joined the William Morris Agency, initially working in its mailroom before becoming an agent.

In 1981, Peresman left William Morris with two other agents to establish International Talent Group. The agency represented touring acts including Pink Floyd, Depeche Mode, Duran Duran, Peter Gabriel, Genesis, Tom Waits, The Cure, and Shawn Colvin.

In 1995, Peresman joined Madison Square Garden as vice president of concerts. He would then go on to become executive vice president of entertainment and chief operating officer of the company's entertainment division.

== Rock and Roll Hall of Fame Foundation ==
In 2006, Peresman became president and chief executive officer of the Rock and Roll Hall of Fame Foundation, succeeding Suzan Evans.

As president and CEO, Peresman has overseen activities involving the Rock and Roll Hall of Fame induction process, fundraising, sponsorship, media relationships, and the annual induction ceremony. Under his leadership, the foundation announced the return of the Hall of Fame induction ceremony to Cleveland in 2009 and then held the ceremony there on a recurring basis.

The foundation also organized the Rock and Roll Hall of Fame 25th Anniversary concerts at Madison Square Garden in 2009. The concerts were broadcast on HBO and received an Emmy Award nomination for Outstanding Variety, Music or Comedy Special.
