= John O'Hara (soccer, born 1959) =

American soccer player

John O’Hara
Personal information
- Date of birth: August 22, 1959 (age 67)
- Place of birth: Philadelphia, Pennsylvania, United States
- Position: Defender

College career
Years	Team	Apps	(Gls)
1977–1978	Pittsburgh Panthers		

Senior career*
Years	Team	Apps	(Gls)
1979–1980	Pennsylvania Stoners		
1979–1980	Pittsburgh Spirit (indoor)	29	(8)
1980–1981	Cleveland Force (indoor)	37	(1)
1981–1986	Pittsburgh Spirit (indoor)	198	(33)
1986–1988	Minnesota Strikers (indoor)	96	(16)
- * Club domestic league appearances and goals

John O’Hara is an American retired soccer defender who played professionally in the American Soccer League and Major Indoor Soccer League.

O’Hara graduated from Mt. Lebanon High School. He attended the University of Pittsburgh, playing on the men's soccer team in 1977 and 1978. In 1979, he turned professional with the Pennsylvania Stoners of the American Soccer League. O’Hara returned in 1980 as the Stoners won the league title. In the fall of 1979, O’Hara moved indoors with the Pittsburgh Spirit of the Major Indoor Soccer League. In 1980, the Spirit sent him to the Cleveland Force but he was back in Pittsburgh in 1981. O’Hara remained with the Spirit until it folded in 1986. He then signed with the Minnesota Strikers where he played for two seasons.
