= Ralph Fife =

American football player (1920–2000)

Profile
- Position: Guard

Personal information
- Born: January 26, 1920; Canton, Ohio, U.S.
- Died: January 31, 2000 (age 80); Pittsburgh, Pennsylvania, U.S.
- Listed height: 5 ft 11 in (1.80 m)
- Listed weight: 207 lb (94 kg)

Career information
- High school: Canton (OH) McKinley
- College: Pittsburgh

Career history
- Chicago Cardinals (1942, 1945); Pittsburgh Steelers (1946)

Awards and highlights
- First-team All-American (1941); First-team All-Eastern (1941)

Ralph Donald Fife Sr.(January 26, 1920 - January 31, 2000) was an American football player and coach.

== Early life ==
Fife was born in 1920 in Canton, Ohio. He played football at Canton McKinley High School where he blocked for Marion Motley and was selected as an all-state player.

== College football ==
He played college football for the Pittsburgh Panthers football team. He played guard on offense and linebacker on defense. In December 1941, he was selected by the Associated Press as a first-team guard on the 1941 All-America college football team.

== Pro football and wartime service ==
He signed with the Chicago Cardinals of the National Football League (NFL) in October 1942. He appeared in four games, three as a starter, for the Cardinals at the guard position during the 1943 season. His football career was interrupted by service in the Navy during World War II. After the war, he returned to the Cardinals for one start during the 1945 season. In 1946, he was traded to the Pittsburgh Steelers, appearing in 10 games, nine as a starter. He appeared in a total of 15 NFL games.

== Coaching career ==
In December 1946, Fife was named head coach of the Turtle Creek Union High School football team. He remained at Turtle Creek until 1950, when he accepted a job as line coach at Nebraska. He became head football coach at Mt. Lebanon High School in 1954. In 1967, after coaching the 1966 team to an undefeated season and state championship, he became head football coach and director of physical education at neighboring Chartiers Valley High School. He retired from coaching in 1978.

== Death ==
He died in 2000.
