= Eric Angle =

American professional, amateur wrestler

Personal information
- Born: August 8, 1967 (age 59) Mt. Lebanon, Pennsylvania, U.S.
- Education: Waynesburg University
- Family: Kurt Angle (brother)

Professional wrestling career
- Ring name: Eric Angle
- Billed height: 6 ft 1 in (1.85 m)
- Billed weight: 245 lb (111 kg)
- Billed from: Pittsburgh, Pennsylvania
- Trained by: Dangerous Danny Davis; Kurt Angle; Ohio Valley Wrestling
- Debut: November 2000
- Retired: December 2003

Eric Angle (born August 8, 1967) is an American former amateur and professional wrestler. He is the older brother of professional wrestler Kurt Angle with whom he worked in occasional storylines in World Wrestling Federation/Entertainment (WWF/WWE).

== Amateur wrestling ==
Angle participated in amateur wrestling in his high school, Mt. Lebanon High School, where he weighed in at 167 pounds in 1985. He wrestled at Waynesburg University after high school.

== Professional wrestling ==
Angle debuted in World Wrestling Federation (WWF) at the 2000 Survivor Series pay-per-view as a heel to help his then-heel brother Kurt retain the WWF Championship against The Undertaker by wearing the same wrestling tights and switching places. He returned the next night on Raw Is War only to be attacked by The Undertaker. After these two appearances, the WWF signed Angle to a developmental contract and he was sent to Ohio Valley Wrestling (OVW) to sharpen his skills. During his time in OVW, he tore a ligament in his arm and went through nine surgeries to help correct his biceps problems.

He returned to OVW in October 2002 and wrestled on a few of their television tapings. In November 2002, Angle appeared in a few house shows for WWE. Angle returned to WWE television on an episode of SmackDown! in March 2003 to aid in a storyline between his brother and then-babyface Brock Lesnar, leading to a match at WrestleMania XIX between Lesnar and Kurt. Angle switched places with Kurt to help him defeat Lesnar and retain his WWE Championship. He then appeared on an episode of SmackDown! the following week at his brother's side and was attacked by Lesnar. This was the last time Angle was seen in WWE as he was released from his developmental contract in 2003.

In August 2003, Angle returned to wrestling in a local Pittsburgh independent promotion, International Wrestling Cartel (IWC). He wrestled for the promotion on three occasions. He was injured in his last match for the company and during his rehabilitation, decided to quit wrestling.

== Personal life ==
In March 2019, he was arrested for assault after video surfaced showing him choking and tossing a twelve-year-old boy by the neck at a wrestling tournament. The charges were dropped four months later. Angle was later indicted that September for distributing anabolic steroids. As a member of the "qu4ntum" drug trafficking organization, Angle sold anabolic steroids and other controlled substances, paid for using cryptocurrency and cash, on the dark web. He pleaded guilty to the charges in January 2020 and was sentenced to a two-year probation period and a $5,000 fine that June.

In 2022, he was diagnosed with kidney cancer.

== Championships and accomplishments ==
- Pro Wrestling Illustrated
  - Ranked No. 253 of the top 500 singles wrestlers in the PWI 500 in 2001
