= Timothy Hauser =

American economist

Timothy J. Hauser (December 6, 1948, Pittsburgh, Pennsylvania – August 18, 2005, Nags Head, North Carolina) was an American economist in public administration and the civil service of the United States.

== Biography ==
Timothy Hauser graduated from Mt. Lebanon High School near Pittsburgh, Pennsylvania, in 1966. He then attended Georgetown University, earning a master's degree in international relations in 1972. He did additional postgraduate work at the Johns Hopkins University Paul H. Nitze School of Advanced International Studies, in Washington, D.C., and in Bologna, Italy. He was fluent in both Italian and French.

Hauser served in the United States Army as a captain in the 1970s. He went to work as an economist with the Bureau of Labor Statistics in 1971. He moved to the United States Department of Commerce on the staff of the assistant secretary for policy before 1980. In 1986, he was detailed to the White House for a year as deputy executive secretary of the Economic Policy Council, after which he returned to the Commerce Department as deputy assistant secretary of planning.

In 1991, he became the first career civil servant to be appointed deputy undersecretary of the Commerce Department. He earned the Presidential Rank Award of Distinguished Executive twice, in 1992 and 2003. The International Trade Administration has established the Timothy J. Hauser Award in his honour.
