= James O'Toole (reporter) =

American journalist

- Born: Pittsburgh, Pennsylvania
- Occupation: Journalist
- Notable credit: Pittsburgh Post-Gazette
- Spouse: Christine Hoffner O'Toole
- Children: 2 children

James O'Toole is a prominent journalist in Pennsylvania, working for the Pittsburgh Post-Gazette as the politics editor. Prior to that, O'Toole has held several positions for the Pittsburgh Post-Gazette, including the Pennsylvania State Capitol correspondent, United States Capitol correspondent, state editor, and supervisor of the paper's public opinion polling division. He received several journalist training fellowships in Asia, including the Jefferson Fellowship, Hong Kong Fellowship, and the East-West Center's Senior Journalists' Seminar.

In 2005, he was named one of "Pennsylvania's Most Influential Reporters" by the Pennsylvania political news website PoliticsPA.
