= Deion Turman =

American basketball player

Deion Turman is an American professional basketball player, born August 13, 1992. The 6'8", 215-pound center played his high school ball at Mt. Lebanon, where he helped his team to the 2010 Western Pennsylvania Interscholastic Athletic League class 4A state title. Turman averaged 10.1 points per game and 12.9 rebounds per game while guiding his team to a 25–3 overall record as a high school senior. Deion received a scholarship from Robert Morris for the 2010–2011 season where he contributed 9 points and 15 rebounds. Deion left Robert Morris after his first year to take a scholarship at Wingate University for the remainder of his college career.

In the 2014–2015 season with the Reading Rockets (EBL, UK), Turman received honors for All British EBL Division 1 - Second Team, and All British EBL Division 1 - All Import Team as well as Reading Rockets team award of MIP.

Wingate Season Statistics:

2013-2014	2012-2013	2011–2012
Games played 25	Games played 31	Games played 32
Rebounds/game 9.7	Rebounds/game 7.4	Rebounds/game 4.9
Points/game 13.6	Points/game 9.1	Points/game 5.3
FG Pct 49.0	FG Pct 63.5	FG Pct 61.7
FT Pct 78.0	FT Pct 47.7	FT Pct 60.7
3FG Pct 0	3FG Pct 0	3FG Pct 0
Assist/game 0.9	Assist/game 0.6	Assist/game 0.3
Blocks/game 0.9	Blocks/game 1.3	Blocks/game 1.5
Steals/game 0.4	Steals/game 0.5	Steals/game 0.3
Assts/turnover ratio 0.5	Assts/turnover ratio 0.6	Assts/turnover ratio 0.6
Turnovers/game 1.7	Turnovers/game 1.1	Turnovers/game

Notable Honors: All SAC Honors in 2014, 2013 · All-State Honors 2014 · SAC Player of the Week 2014, 2013 · Monroe Player of the Week, 2014, 2013 All Tournament Player 2011–2012

In July 2014 Deion signed as a professional basketball player with Strategic Sports. In August, he went on to sign with the Reading Rockets (United Kingdom)
