= Christina Duhig =

American poet

- Education: Case Western Reserve University; University of North Carolina at Greensboro (MFA)
- Occupation: Poet

Christina Duhig is an American poet.

== Life ==
Originally from Pittsburgh, Pennsylvania, she studied at Case Western Reserve University and received a Master of Fine Arts from the University of North Carolina, Greensboro. She has taught at North Carolina A&T State University. and John Jay College of Criminal Justice. She currently lives in Brooklyn and teaches at Bronx Community College and Fordham University.

Her poems have appeared in Best New Poets 2007, Washington Square, The Greensboro Review, Barrow Street, and Tuesday; An Art Project.

== Works ==
- "Post Trauma", Greensboro Review, Fall 2007
- The city skirts University of North Carolina at Greensboro (2007)

=== Anthologies ===
- Natasha Trethewey; Jeb Livingood, eds. (2007). Best new poets, 2007. Samovar Press. ISBN 978-0-9766296-2-7.
