= Jon Delano =

American journalist

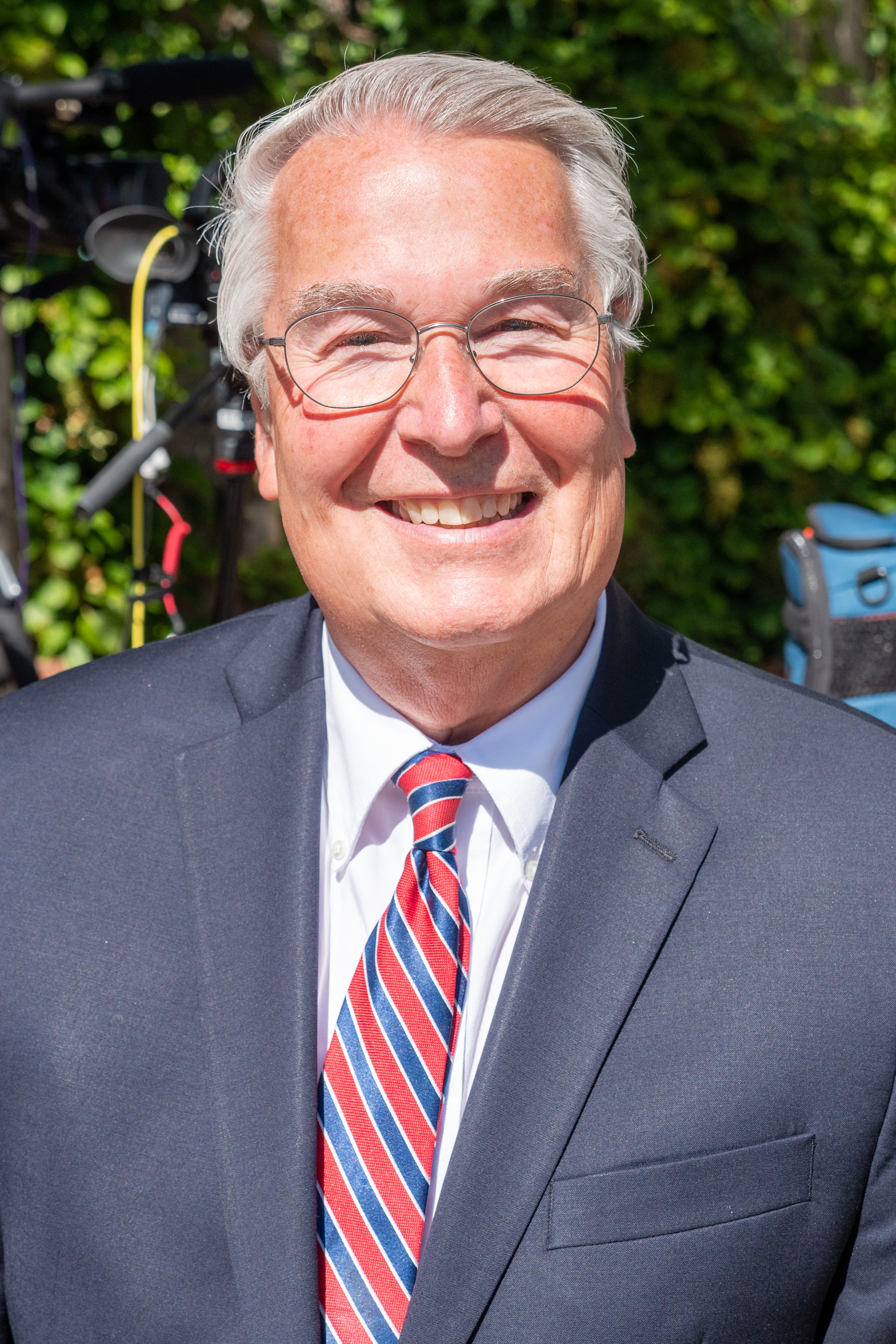
- Born: New Haven, Connecticut, U.S.
- Education: Haverford College; University of Pennsylvania Law School
- Occupation: Journalist
- Spouse: Jane
- Children: 2

Jon Delano is an American journalist. He is the Money & Politics Editor for KDKA-TV (CBS) in Pittsburgh, Pennsylvania, a position he began on a full-time basis in 2001 after joining the station in 1994 as its political analyst.

== Career ==
A graduate of Haverford College and University of Pennsylvania Law School, Delano spent 14 years working as chief of staff for Congressman Doug Walgren.

In 1994, he became the political analyst for KDKA-TV. In September 2001, Delano became the station's Money & Politics Editor. Delano reports nightly on governmental, political, and economic news and hosts the Sunday Business Page segments for KDKA’s weekend news.

He taught courses in media and public policy, money and politics, legislative policy-making, and public policy implementation as an adjunct professor at the H. John Heinz III College at Carnegie Mellon University for 25 years, retiring in March 2020. From 1995 to 2020, he also wrote a weekly and monthly column called “Government Busters” for the Pittsburgh Business Times.
