= Christine Laitta =

American actress

- Born: Mt. Lebanon, Pennsylvania, United States
- Occupations: Stage actress, director, educator, author

Christine Laitta is an American actress from Pittsburgh, Pennsylvania.

== Biography ==
Born in the Pittsburgh suburb of Mt. Lebanon, Laitta is a member of Actors' Equity Association and SAG-AFTRA. Her credits include author, director, choreographer, teacher and actor. She is a graduate of Penn State University in University Park, Pennsylvania.

Laitta originated the role as Ms. Frizzle on the first national tour of the Magic School Bus Live.

Laitta has performed at the Pittsburgh Public Theatre, Civic Light Opera Cabaret Theater. The CLO Cabaret is the only extended run venue in Pittsburgh. Laitta starred in Girls Only, I Love You, You're Perfect, Now Change, Forbidden Broadway, and Forbidden Broadway: SVU. Laitta wrote and performs in an audience participation show entitled TV Tunes. This original cabaret became the inspiration for Armstrong Cable's Television Plus advertising campaign: The Golden Age of Television. Laitta appeared in their television, radio and print advertisements. Laitta’s TV Tunes has appeared at the Pittsburgh City Theatre and continually is featured at the CLO Cabaret late night performances.

Favorite roles include Maria (The Sound of Music), Ms Hannagin (Annie), Antonia (Man of La Mancha), Female Authority Figure (Hairspray), Carrie (Carousel), Lucy Schmeeler (On the Town), Joanne (Godspell), Martha (The Secret Garden), Principal Player (Tomfoolery), Scout (To Kill a Mockingbird), Mary (Run for Your Wife), and caroler (A Musical Christmas Carol).

Laitta portrayed the role of Principal Anderson in the Emmy Award winning PBS pilot Scientastic! with Planet Earth Television in which she also served as choreographer and script consultant. She was also hired to help coach the child actors, this production was directed by Leo Eaton.

Laitta is also the co-author of the book The Dramatically Different Classroom (Kagan Publishing). This book is an instructional tool for teachers. It helps teachers incorporating drama and music into classroom activities. She has done in-service development sessions based on her book with the Pittsburgh Public Schools, as well.

She teaches musical theatre and acting for the Pittsburgh Public School District at Pittsburgh Creative and Performing Arts 6-12 School. She has developed and taught several outreach programs and master classes for regional theaters and school districts, as well as directed several high school musicals in the area. Laitta also co-directed and choreographed the Legacy Concert for Pittsburgh CAPA in 2011 featuring Tony award winner Billy Porter as special guest.
