= George Savarese =

American radio personality

George R. Savarese
- Education: Duquesne University
- Occupation: Teacher
- Known for: CBS Radio, NPR, KQV Radio, WDUQ, ESPN Radio

George Savarese is an educator and radio personality.

== Education ==
Savarese studied at the private catholic Duquesne University in Pittsburgh. There, he earned his Bachelor's degree in History, English and Political Science, a Master's degree in History, and a Master's degree in Education. Savarese also did Graduate Work at Cambridge University in England.

== Media career ==
George Savarese worked as a radio journalist for over 25 years. He served as the host of the "Global Press Conference," on KQV radio for 10 years and worked as News Director of WDUQ in Pittsburgh. Savarese also worked as a correspondent for National Public Radio and CBS Radio. He covered Pittsburgh sports as a correspondent for ESPN-Radio and the NFL Radio Network on Sirius XM Radio. In his career, he interviewed Mario Lemieux, Wayne Gretzky, Ron Francis, Jaromir Jagr, Tony Gwynn, Cal Ripken, Albert Pujols, Derek Jeter, Troy Polamalu, Heath Miller and Cam Heyward.

== Educational career ==
For over 25 years, George Savarese has been a teacher at Mt. Lebanon High School in Mt. Lebanon, Pennsylvania. Prior to joining Mt. Lebanon, Savarese taught at the University of Pittsburgh's PA Governor's School for International Studies and was Education Director of the World Affairs Council of Pittsburgh. There he launched the International Affairs Apprenticeship with the AIU.

As the school's former Forensics Coach, Savarese guided his students to ten consecutive Pittsburgh District titles and the 2006 State Championship. In his tenure as Director of Speech & Debate, he also coached 27 Mt. Lebanon students to individual State Championships, including four Extemporaneous Speaking champions. Five of his students were National Finalists at NFL Nationals, four finishing as runners-up in their National Championship events of Dramatic Interpretation, Dramatic Duo and Impromptu. Savarese also started Mt. Lebanon's Model United Nations (MUN) team in 1997 along with his colleague and friend, Peter DiNardo. Savarese continues to coach the Mt. Lebanon MUN team. MUN at Mt. Lebanon has consistently been ranked among the premier programs in the country.

For his work at the high school, Savarese was named a Teacher of Excellence by the Teacher Excellence Center, and was honored for his dedication to teaching global issues by the organization Global Links.

He was also chosen as one of ten Pennsylvania teachers to travel to EU and NATO headquarters in Brussels as part of a European Union program.

Savarese is often invited to speak to community groups in the Pittsburgh area and has served on the Advisory Board of Global Links, the World Affairs Council of Pittsburgh and the Heinz History Center.
