= Tom Jelley =

American football player (1926–2014)

No. 86
- Position: Defensive end

Personal information
- Born: November 20, 1926; Pittsburgh, Pennsylvania, U.S.
- Died: January 16, 2014 (aged 87)
- Listed height: 6 ft 5 in (1.96 m)
- Listed weight: 225 lb (102 kg)

Career information
- High school: Mt. Lebanon (Mt. Lebanon, Pennsylvania)
- College: Miami (FL)
- NFL draft: 1951: 4th round, 49th overall pick

Career history
- Pittsburgh Steelers (1951)

Awards and highlights
- Orange Bowl (1946)

Career NFL statistics
- Receptions: 1
- Receiving yards: 8
- Fumble recoveries: 1
- Stats at Pro Football Reference

Thomas J. Jelley (November 20, 1926 – January 16, 2014) was an American professional football defensive end who played one season for the Pittsburgh Steelers of the National Football League (NFL). He was selected by the Chicago Bears in the fourth round of the 1951 NFL draft. He played college football at the University of Miami for the Miami Hurricanes football team.

Jelley died on January 16, 2014, at the age of 87.
