= Edward Bleiberg =

American historian

- Born: March 8, 1951 (age 75)
- Education: University of Toronto
- Occupations: Egyptologist and Curator at the Brooklyn Museum

Edward "Ed" Bleiberg (born 1951) is an American archaeologist and Egyptologist. He graduated from Haverford College, did graduate studies at Yale University and the Hebrew University of Jerusalem, and finally received an M.A. and Ph.D. from the University of Toronto. Since 1998, he has been the curator of Egyptian, Near Eastern, and classical art at the Brooklyn Museum. Some of his academic work has included research into the Jewish minorities living in the ancient world and ancient Egyptian burial customs. He has also appeared in a documentary, King Tut's Gold.

== Major publications ==
- Soulful Creatures: Animal Mummies in Ancient Egypt. (Brooklyn, NY: Brooklyn Museum, 2013)
- Tree of Paradise: Jewish Mosaics from the Roman Empire. (Brooklyn, NY: Brooklyn Museum, 2005)
- The Official Gift in Ancient Egypt. (Norman: U of Oklahoma, 1996)
- To Live Forever: Egyptian Treasures from the Brooklyn Museum. (Brooklyn, NY: Brooklyn Museum, 2008)
- Jewish Life in Ancient Egypt: A Family Archive from the Nile Valley. (Brooklyn, NY: Brooklyn Museum of Art, 2002.)
