= Aidan Wright =

University of Michigan Professor

Aidan G. C. Wright
- Education: Pennsylvania State University (BA, PhD), Villanova University (MS)
- Occupation: Professor of Psychology
- Employer: University of Michigan

Aidan G. C. Wright is an American professor of psychology who holds the Phil F. Jenkins Research Professorship in Depression at the University of Michigan. His research explores the connection between personality traits and mental health issues, utilizing real-time data collection methods, such as smartphone surveys and passive sensing, to study people’s behavior and well-being in everyday life.

Wright has published more than 250 scholarly articles since 2009, with his work receiving over 21,000 citations.

Wright has proposed in a 2022 paper that the core of personality disorders involves difficulties understanding and relating to self and others, and thus the personality disorders should be recast as the interpersonal disorders. He proposes interpersonal dysfunction explains extreme social challenges and treatment difficulties that are characteristic of this class of psychopathology.

== Biography ==
Aidan Wright earned his Bachelor of Arts in Psychology from The Pennsylvania State University between 1999 and 2003.

He then completed his Master of Science in Psychology at Villanova University from 2004 to 2006, where he wrote a thesis titled Retrospective Complementarity and the Interpersonal Situation, under the supervision of Patrick M. Markey, PhD.

From 2011 to 2012, Wright completed a predoctoral clinical internship at the Western Psychiatric Institute and Clinic, Department of Psychiatry, University of Pittsburgh School of Medicine.

During this period, Wright also pursued his Doctor of Philosophy in Clinical Psychology at The Pennsylvania State University, completing his PhD between 2006 and 2012. His dissertation, titled Comparing Methods to Model Stability and Change in Personality and its Pathology, was supervised by Aaron L. Pincus, Ph.D.

In 2012, Wright became a Postdoctoral Scholar at the Department of Psychiatry, University of Pittsburgh School of Medicine, where he was awarded the Ruth L. Kirschstein NRSA Trainee fellowship.

He then went on to become a Postdoctoral Fellow in 2013 at the Department of Psychology, State University of New York at Buffalo, receiving the Ruth L. Kirschstein NRSA Individual Fellowship.
