= Gloria Bigelow =

American comedian

- Born: Pittsburgh, Pennsylvania

Comedy career
- Medium: Stand-up, television, podcast
- Genres: Sexuality, race, gender
- Website: www.globigelow.com

Gloria "Glo" Bigelow is an American comedian, writer, and actress based in Los Angeles.

== Biography ==
Bigelow was born in Pittsburgh and grew up in the nearby suburb of Mount Lebanon. After leaving Pennsylvania in 1989, she started her comedy career doing stand-up in New York clubs such as The Improv, Carolines on Broadway, and Gotham Comedy Club. Since then she has performed at comedy clubs and festivals around the world and made numerous television and film appearances. From 2008 to 2013 she was a cast member on the AfterEllen series, Cherry Bomb. She hosted the pre and post show for the first annual NewNowNext Awards on the Logo channel, and was nominated in 2009 for their "Brink of Fame" award. She has written for Last Comic Standing and appeared as a contestant on the show. She appeared on OutTV's Hot Gay Comics in 2009. She has also appeared in television specials such as Showtime's Fierce Funny Women (2011) and Wanda Sykes's Herlarious (2013), and in documentaries such as Out in the City (2009), U People (2009), and Laughing Matters...Next Gen (2009). Her writing is included in the 2012 Seal Press anthology, Here Come The Brides! Reflections on Lesbian Love and Marriage, which was a finalist for the Lambda Literary Award.
