= Gene Breen =

American football player (born 1941)

No. 61, 52, 53
- Position: Linebacker

Personal information
- Born: June 21, 1941 (age 85); Crafton, Pennsylvania, U.S.
- Listed height: 6 ft 2 in (1.88 m)
- Listed weight: 230 lb (104 kg)

Career information
- High school: Mt. Lebanon (Mt. Lebanon, Pennsylvania)
- College: Virginia Tech
- NFL draft: 1963: 15th round, 210th overall pick
- AFL draft: 1963: 16th round, 122nd overall pick

Career history
- Green Bay Packers (1964); Pittsburgh Steelers (1965–1966); Los Angeles Rams (1967–1968)

Career NFL statistics
- Sacks: 2
- Stats at Pro Football Reference

Joseph Eugene Breen (born June 21, 1941) is an American former professional football player who was a linebacker in the National Football League (NFL). He played college football for the Virginia Tech Hokies.

== Early life ==
Breen was born Joseph Eugene Breen on June 21, 1941 in Crafton, Pennsylvania.

== Career ==
Breen was selected by the Green Bay Packers in the 15th round of the 1963 NFL draft and played with the team during the 1964 NFL season. He had also been drafted in the sixteenth round of the 1963 AFL draft by the San Diego Chargers. Following his time with the Packers, he played two seasons with the Pittsburgh Steelers and two seasons with the Los Angeles Rams.

He played on the defensive line at the collegiate level at Virginia Tech and was awarded All Southern Conference honors. He also wrestled at Virginia Tech, where he won the Southern Conference Championship at Heavyweight division. Breen was elected to the Virginia Tech Sports Hall of Fame in 2004.
