= Gwyn Cready =

American author of romance novels

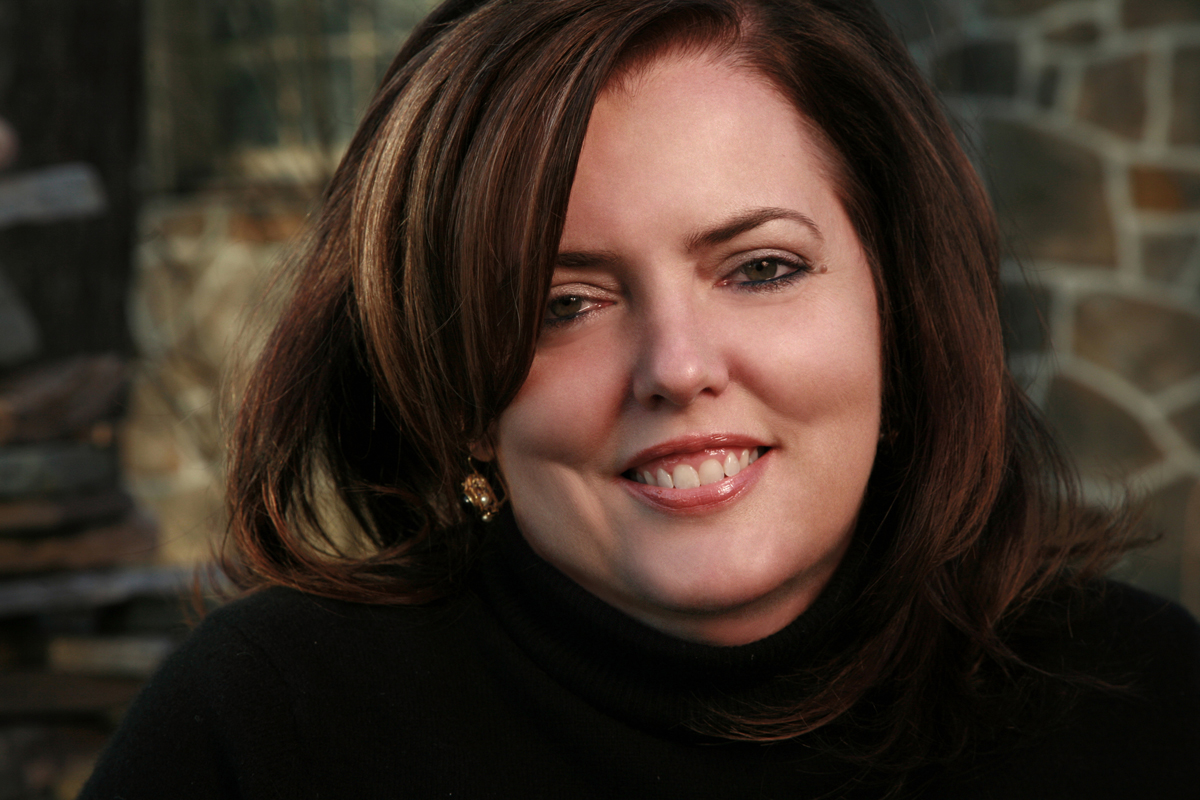
- Cready in September 2008
- Born: January 17, 1962 (age 64); Pittsburgh, Pennsylvania, U.S.
- Education: Mt. Lebanon High School; University of Chicago (MBA)
- Occupation: Novelist
- Writing career
- Period: 2007–present
- Genre: Romance
- Notable work: Seducing Mr. Darcy
- Notable awards: RITA award – Paranormal Romance; 2009 Seducing Mr. Darcy

Gwyn Cready (born January 17, 1962) is an American author of romance novels.

== Biography ==
=== Personal life ===
Cready was born in Pittsburgh, Pennsylvania. She attended Mt. Lebanon High School, where she became close friends with novelist Teri Coyne and shared theatre classes with actress Ming-Na. She graduated in 1979 and attended the University of Chicago, graduating with a bachelor's in English literature in 1983 and an MBA in marketing in 1986. After graduation, Cready worked as a brand manager in the pharmaceutical industry.

She married Lester Pyle in 1986. They have two children, born in 1988 and 1994.

=== Writing career ===
Cready is a paranormal romance author who specializes in comedic time travel stories. Her novels are typically set in her hometown, Pittsburgh. Her first book, Tumbling Through Time (2008), involves a woman who tries on a pair of magical pink sandals in the Nine West shoe store in the Pittsburgh Airport and ends up on the deck of a privateer ship in 1705. Her second book, Seducing Mr. Darcy (2008), involves a woman who, through a magical massage in which one is encouraged to "imagine oneself in one's favorite book," enters the world of Pride and Prejudice.

Publishers Weekly called Tumbling Through Time "a joy" and Cready "an author worth watching." Given the humorous tone and situations which often involve one woman and two men, Cready's books have been likened to those of Janet Evanovich. Seducing Mr. Darcy won the 2009 RITA Award for Best Paranormal Romance Novel.

== Works ==
- Tumbling Through Time (2007)
- Seducing Mr. Darcy (2008)
- Flirting With Forever (2010)
- Aching for Always (2010)
- A Novel Seduction (2011)
- Timeless Desire (2012)

== Awards and reception ==
- 2009 - Romance Writers of America RITA Award, Paranormal Romance – Seducing Mr. Darcy

== Sources ==
- Author's web site
- Publishers Weekly review of Tumbling Through Time
- Author's page on publisher site
- Best Romance Stories review of Flirting With Forever
