= John Fitsioris =

Greek-American former basketball player (born 1967)

Personal information
- Born: 1967 (age 58–59)
- Listed height: 6 ft 2 in (1.88 m)
- Listed weight: 180 lb (82 kg)

Career information
- High school: Mt. Lebanon (Mt. Lebanon, Pennsylvania)
- College: Westminster (1985–1989)
- Playing career: 1989–1999
- Position: Shooting guard

Career history
- 1989–1994: Panionios
- 1994–1998: Dafni
- 1998–1999: Chalkida

Career highlights
- Greek Basketball Cup (1991)

John Fitsioris (Greek: Γιάννης Φιτσιώρης, born 1967) is a Greek-American former basketball player. Following his college career at Westminster College, he played professionally in Greece for several years, winning the Greek Basketball Cup in 1991 with Panionios B.C.

== High school career ==
Fitsioris played Mt. Lebanon High School in Mt. Lebanon, Pennsylvania. He was the captain of the basketball team during his senior year and led it in scoring with 18 points per game.

== College career ==
From 1985 to 1989, Fitsioris played college basketball with Westminster College. He was a three-year starter and the co-captain during his senior season when he averaged 15.7 points per game and made 31 of 66 three point shots while shooting 55 percent overall from the field.

== Professional career ==
Fitsioris started his professional career with Panionios B.C. in the Greek Basket League during the 1989–1990 season. During his five seasons with the team, he helped them win the Greek Basketball Cup in 1991 and played with the team in their 1993–1994 FIBA Korać Cup semi-final run alongside the future NBA player Ed Stokes. He later played for Dafnis B.C. from 1994 to 1998 before finishing his career with Chalkida in 1998–1999.

== Later life ==
Following his playing career, Fitsioris was a coach at Northgate High School from 2001 to 2003.

== Personal life ==
Fitsioris parents, Marta and George, where born in Greece but moved to the United States after they got married.
