= Paige Kassalen =

American electrical engineer (born 1993)

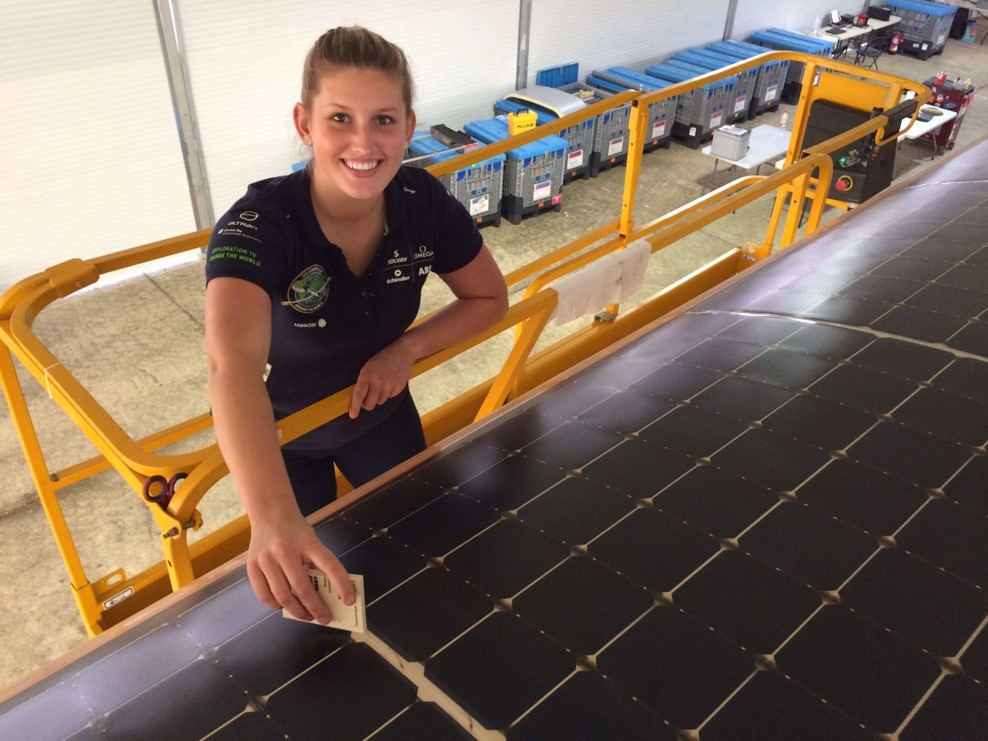
- Kassalen working with Solar Impulse 2 in 2016
- Born: May 19, 1993 (age 33); Pittsburgh, Pennsylvania
- Education: Virginia Tech, Carnegie Mellon
- Occupation: Electrical engineer
- Known for: Only American and youngest member of the ground crew for the Solar Impulse 2 project

Paige Kassalen (born in Pittsburgh, Pennsylvania) is an American electrical engineer. At age 22, she was the only American, female engineer, and youngest member of the ground crew for the Solar Impulse 2 project. In 2017, she appeared on the Forbes 30 Under 30 list in the energy category. After Solar Impulse, Kassalen helped Covestro build their strategy for materials for autonomous vehicles and shared her work at conferences around the United States. While pursuing her master's degree at Carnegie Mellon, she worked at the Carnegie Mellon Metro21: Smart Cities Institute.

== Early life ==
Kassalen was born in Pittsburgh, Pennsylvania and graduated from Mt. Lebanon High School in 2011.

== Education ==
Kassalen received a Bachelor of Science degree in electrical engineering from Virginia Tech in 2015, where she was named the Bradley Department of Electrical and Computer Engineering's Outstanding Senior and Sorority Woman of the Year. After graduation, she accepted a full-time position at Covestro, a chemical company.

In 2020, Kassalen received a Master of Information Systems Management from Carnegie Mellon.

== Solar Impulse project ==
As a result of the partnership between Covestro and the Solar Impulse project, a position was created for a Covestro representative to join the Solar Impulse 2 flight team. Kassalen applied for this position, and in February 2016 she was offered the opportunity to join the ground crew for the solar-powered aircraft. At 22, she became the youngest member of the crew and was also the only American woman involved in her team. While working as a member of the ground crew, Kassalen's responsibilities included resolving electrical problems in the aircraft and aiding in landing procedures.
