= Brian Cuban =

American lawyer (born 1961)

- Born: January 11, 1961 (age 65); Pittsburgh, Pennsylvania, U.S.
- Education: Pennsylvania State University (BA); University of Pittsburgh (JD)
- Relatives: Mark Cuban (brother)

Brian Cuban (born January 11, 1961) is an American attorney, author, speaker, and activist. He has been described as an authority on male eating disorders, drug addiction, drug rehabilitation, and alcoholism. He is a lawyer and activist in the areas of First Amendment issues and hate speech. He is also the brother of Mark Cuban and resides in Dallas, Texas.

== Early life and education ==
Cuban was born on January 11, 1961, in Pittsburgh, Pennsylvania. He grew up in Pittsburgh and attended Mt. Lebanon High School. Cuban earned his undergraduate degree from Pennsylvania State University and his Juris Doctor from the University of Pittsburgh School of Law.

== Career ==
=== Drug addiction and alcoholism ===
Cuban is a recovering alcoholic and drug user and has maintained sobriety since 2007. In 2017, he wrote a book detailing some of his struggles with drugs, alcoholism, rehab, and how each affects being in the legal profession, The Addicted Lawyer.

=== Eating disorders and body dysmorphic disorder ===
A survivor of bulimia, Cuban has shared his experience with suffering and recovering from an eating disorder in nationwide speaking and television appearances, including a television interview with Katie Couric.

In 2013, he wrote the book Shattered Image: My Triumph Over Body Dysmorphic Disorder.

=== EyeOpener TV ===
Cuban is the segment host for “Brian Cuban’s Legal Briefs” on EyeOpener TV. EyeOpener is a syndicated morning show that covers news, weather, sports, and entertainment news. It runs every weekday morning and is currently syndicated in the following locations: KIAH-TV (Houston, TX), KDAF-TV (Dallas, TX), WSFL-TV (Miami, FL), WPHL-TV (Philadelphia, PA), KRCW-TV (Portland, OR) His "Legal Briefs" segment is available on EyeOpener's YouTube and their Facebook page for out of network location viewers.

=== Hate speech issues with Facebook ===
Cuban has been concerned about hate speech on Facebook. While commenting "As long as [there] are people, there will be hate speech. It’s the human condition," he has discussed hate speech issues in the cyber-bullying and Holocaust denial areas with Facebook management. He concludes "At least in the brick and mortar world I can pull up the Constitution and Supreme Court opinions that guide me. That standard does not represent the beliefs of all Facebook users across the world but for better or worse that is the standard Facebook uses. It’s transparent. Emulate that aspect as well." He has been trying to have the pages with names such as "Holocaust: A Series of Lies" and "Holocaust is a Holohoax" removed from Facebook since 2008.

=== Fallen Patriot Fund ===
Cuban is the executive director of the Mark Cuban Foundation which directly supports the Fallen Patriot Fund. Mark Cuban started the Fallen Patriot Fund to help families of U.S. military persons killed or injured during the Iraq War, personally matching the first $1 million in contributions with funds from the Mark Cuban Foundation.

=== Penn State sex abuse scandal ===
Cuban has been a repeatedly interviewed and quoted source for opinions about the Penn State sex abuse scandal, Joe Paterno, Jerry Sandusky, and Penn State.

== Personal life ==
He is licensed to practice law in Pennsylvania (inactive) and Texas, specializing in First Amendment issues. He runs a blog called "The Cuban Revolution" that he uses as a platform to discuss many First Amendment legal battles and news stories.

He is an advocate of medical marijuana. He is also an eating-disorder survivor and has authored a book about his lifelong struggle with body dysmorphic disorder.

His brother is Mark Cuban, a well-known entrepreneur and billionaire investor who is a minority owner of the NBA Dallas Mavericks.
