= Ann M. Valentine =

American bioinorganic chemist

- Education: University of Virginia (BS); Massachusetts Institute of Technology (PhD)
- Scientific career
- Fields: Bioinorganic chemistry
- Workplaces: Yale University, Temple University
- Thesis: Bioinorganic Hydrocarbon Oxidation: Mechanistic and Kinetic Studies of the Soluble Methane Monooxygenase from Methylococcus capsulatus (Bath) (1998)
- Doctoral advisor: Stephen J. Lippard
- Other academic advisors: Timothy L. Macdonald, Stephen J. Benkovic
- Website: The Valentine Lab

Ann M. Valentine is an American bioinorganic chemist whose research focuses on biomineralization, the uptake and transport of metals, and their medical applications in areas such as cancer research. She has received numerous awards including the 2014 AICChemical Pioneer Award "for her outstanding contributions towards advancing the science of chemistry and impacting the chemical profession" and the 2009 Paul D. Saltman Award for Metals in Biology for "outstanding contributions to the field of metals in biology" and "groundbreaking work on the structures and reactions of complexes containing titanium."

== Education ==
Valentine earned a Bachelor of Science in chemistry from the University of Virginia in 1993. As an undergraduate, she researched aluminum inhibition of magnesium-dependent enzymes with Timothy L. Macdonald. She studied with Stephen J. Lippard at the Massachusetts Institute of Technology and earned her PhD in 1998.

== Career ==
From 1998-2001, Valentine worked with Stephen J. Benkovic as a postdoctoral fellow at Pennsylvania State University. She published on the topics of enzyme kinetics, metallo-beta-lactamase, and the mechanics of replisome and primase in DNA replication.

In 2001, Valentine joined the chemistry faculty of Yale University. During her years there, she was able to begin research into the biological role of titanium, a question which she had long found intriguing. Valentine had become interested in the element early in her graduate career: in the early 1990s, titanium was not recognized as important in bioinorganic chemistry, but was believed by some (including her advisor) to be a candidate for future investigation.

In 2011, Valentine became an associate professor at Temple University where she specializes in environmental, material, and medicinal aspects of inorganic and biological chemistry. Her research group focuses on bioinorganic chemistry, especially nicatransferrin, Ti^{4+} ions, and biotitanification. Valentine was later promoted to Professor of Chemistry at Temple University. She currently serves as Professor and Chair of the Department of Chemistry.

== Outreach and mentorship ==
Valentine has participated in the Philadelphia Area Girls Enjoying Science (PAGES) and Temple Minority Access to Research Careers (MARC) programs. Via the Temple Teaching and Learning Center, she has acted as a mentor for students in high-attrition courses.

== Awards and honors ==
- 2014, American Institute of Chemists Chemical Pioneer Award
- 2009, Paul D. Saltman Award for Metals in Biology
- 2007, American Chemical Society PROGRESS/Dreyfus Lectureship Award
- 2006, American Cancer Society Research Scholar Award
- 2004, National Science Foundation CAREER award
- 2003, Research Corporation Research Innovation Award
- 2015 and 2021, Honors Professor of the Year. 2016, Dean's Distinguished Teaching Award, Temple University
