= Ruth Colker =

American legal scholar (born 1956)

- Born: 1956 (age 69–70)

Academic background
- Education: Radcliffe College (AB); Harvard University (JD)

Academic work
- Discipline: Law
- Sub-discipline: Constitutional law Disability law
- Institutions: Tulane University; University of Toronto; University of Pittsburgh; George Washington University; Ohio State University

Ruth Colker (born 1956) is an American legal scholar who held the position of Distinguished Professor and Heck Faust Chair in Constitutional Law at the Ohio State University Moritz College of Law before her retirement in 2026. She cited Ohio State's implementation of Ohio Senate Bill 1, restricting diversity, equity, and inclusion initiatives as her reason for retiring early. Colker was awarded the 2009 Distinguished University Professor by the university.

== Education ==
Colker earned a Bachelor of Arts degree in social studies from Radcliffe College in 1978 and a Juris Doctor from Harvard Law School in 1981.

== Career ==
Colker's scholarship focuses on constitutional and disability law. She spent four years as a trial attorney in the United States Department of Justice Civil Rights Division. Prior to joining Ohio State University, she worked as a professor at the Tulane University Law School, University of Toronto Faculty of Law, University of Pittsburgh School of Law, and George Washington University Law School.
