= Wayne S. Ewing =

American politician

Member of the Pennsylvania Senate from the 37th district
- In office November 29, 1967 – November 30, 1976
- Preceded by: Edwin Ewing
- Succeeded by: Michael Schaefer

Personal details
- Born: February 14, 1929 Coraopolis, Pennsylvania, US
- Died: March 19, 2010 (aged 81) West Chester, Pennsylvania, US

Wayne S. Ewing (February 14, 1929 – March 19, 2010) was a former member of the Pennsylvania State Senate, serving from 1967 to 1976.
