= Kenyen R. Brown =

American attorney

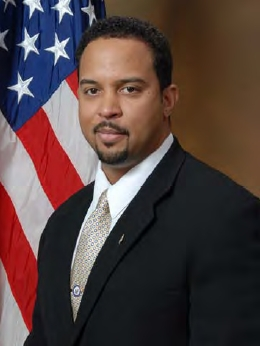

United States Attorney for the Southern District of Alabama
- In office December 4, 2009 – March 10, 2017
- President: Barack Obama; Donald Trump
- Preceded by: Deborah Rhodes
- Succeeded by: Richard W. Moore

Personal details
- Born: Kenyen Ray Brown
- Party: Democratic
- Education: University of Alabama (BA); University of Tennessee (JD)

Kenyen Ray Brown is an American attorney who served as the United States Attorney for the Southern District of Alabama from 2009 to 2017. Brown was the first African American to serve in this position in the state of Alabama.

== See also ==
- 2017 dismissal of U.S. attorneys
- Kenyen Brown Joins Hughes Hubbard & Reed as Partner
