= Samuel A. Schreiner Jr. =

American novelist

Samuel Agnew Schreiner Jr. (June 6, 1921 – January 14, 2018) was an American writer.

Born in Mt. Lebanon, a suburb of Pittsburgh, Pennsylvania, Schreiner graduated from Princeton University in 1942. During World War II he served in the U.S. Army Office of Strategic Services as a cryptographer from 1942 to 1945. He served in the China-Burma-India theater and became a first lieutenant, receiving both a Bronze Star and Presidential Unit Citation.

Schreiner began his career as a reporter for the McKeesport Daily News and the Pittsburgh Sun-Telegraph from 1946 to 1951. At Parade in New York he was a writer and assistant managing editor from 1951 to 1955. He then moved to Reader's Digest where he served as an editor from 1955 to 1974. In 1974 he devoted himself full-time to writing.

== Personal life and death ==
Schreiner and his wife, Doris Ann (née Moon 1921–2012), married in 1945. They had two daughters.

Schreiner died at his home in Darien, Connecticut on January 14, 2018. He was 96.

== Books ==
Schreiner's debut novel, Thine Is the Glory, published in 1975

- Thine Is the Glory, novel (New York: Arbor House, 1975).
  - Set in Pittsburgh, the work is a multi-generational saga set against the rise of an industrial city from the mid-19th century until World War II. The protagonist is Scott Shallenberger Stewart, who begins as a country boy and ends as a moneyed power player like Andrew Carnegie, Henry Clay Frick, Andrew W. Mellon, George Westinghouse, and others.
- Pleasant Places, novel (New York: Arbor House, 1976).
- The Condensed World of the Reader's Digest, nonfiction (Chicago: Stein Publishing, 1977).
- Angelica, novel (New York: Arbor House, 1977).
- The Possessors and the Possessed, novel (New York: Arbor House, 1980).
- The Van Alens: First Family of a Nation's First City, novel (New York: Arbor House, 1981).
- A Place Called Princeton, nonfiction (New York: Arbor House, 1984).
- The Trials of Mrs. Lincoln, nonfiction (New York: Donald I. Fine, 1987).
- Cycles: Recurring Forces That Can Predict Changes in Your Health, Moods, Relationships, Financial Investments, the Wealth , nonfiction (New York: Donald I. Fine, 1990).
- May Day! May Day!, nonfiction (New York: Donald I. Fine, 1990).
- Code of Conduct, (With Everett Alvarez), nonfiction (New York: Donald I. Fine, 1990).
- Henry Clay Frick, biography (New York: St. Martin's Press, 1995).
- The Passionate Beechers: A Family Saga of Sanctity and Scandal that Changed America, biography (New York: John Wiley, 2004).
- The Concord Quartet: Alcott, Emerson, Hawthorne, Thoreau and the Friendship That Freed the American Mind, biography (New York: John Wiley, 2006).
