= Carole Beebe Tarantelli =

American-Italian politician

Carole Jane Beebe Tarantelli
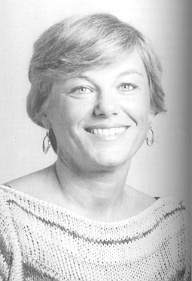

Member of the Italian Chamber of Deputies
- In office 1987–1996

Personal details
- Born: July 12, 1942 (age 84) Elizabeth, New Jersey, U.S.
- Party: Independent Left
- Education: University of Michigan, Brandeis University

Carole Jane Beebe Tarantelli (born July 12, 1942) is an American-born former member of the Italian parliament. She was the first American citizen elected to the Italian Chamber of Deputies.

== Early life and education ==
Tarantelli was born in Elizabeth, New Jersey on July 12, 1942. She graduated from Wellesley College in 1964. She then attended the University of Michigan where she earned a master of arts in English literature before moving on to Brandeis University where she earned a Ph.D. in English literature.

At Brandeis, she met Ezio Tarantelli, an Italian labor economist. The couple married in 1970 and moved to Italy. Ezio was assassinated by Red Brigade terrorists in 1985. They had a son, Luca.

== Life in Rome ==
After moving to Italy, Tarantelli began teaching the English language and English literature at the Sapienza University of Rome. In 1979, she began training to become a psychoanalyst at the Italian Center for Analytical Psychology, and she entered private practice in 1982. While in Italy, Tarantelli was active in the feminist movement. She took part in a number of international seminars featuring feminist intellectuals.

Following her husband's murder, she met in prison with terrorists who were questioning terrorist methods and the impact it was having on Italy. She also became active as an anti-terrorism activist, appearing in print and on television. Tarantelli helped found Differenza Donna, an organization dedicated to combating violence against women, in 1988. She served as president from 1988 to 1995.

As of 2005, Tarantelli continued to teach at the Sapienza, volunteered at Differenza Donna, and worked as a psychoanalyst.

== Chamber of Deputies ==
Tarantelli was elected to the Chamber of Deputies in 1987 and focused on women's issues, including legislation focusing on rape, domestic violence, abortion, and family leave. She was the first American ever elected to parliament in Italy. She was reelected twice and stepped down in 1996. She was a member of the Independent Left parliamentary delegation.

== Awards ==
Tarantelli received the Alumnae Achievement Award from Wellesley College in 2005.
