= Linn F. Mollenauer =

American physicist (1937–2021)

Linn Frederick Mollenauer
- Born: January 6, 1937; Washington, District of Columbia
- Died: July 28, 2021 (aged 84); Silver Spring, Maryland
- Education: Cornell University; Stanford University
- Scientific career
- Fields: Physics
- Workplaces: Bell Labs, UC Berkeley

Linn Frederick Mollenauer (1937–2021) was an American physicist who worked on quantum optics, including the study of solitons in fiber optics.

Mollenauer was born on 6 January 1937. He studied at Cornell University, receiving his doctorate in physics from Stanford University in 1965. He taught for seven years at Berkeley, before embarking on a research career at Bell Labs from 1972.

A key advance was in February 1993, when Mollenauer succeeded in transmitting "10 billion bits per second through 20,000 kilometres of fibers with a simple soliton system".

In 1982, he received the R. W. Wood Prize. In 1986, Mollenauer was awarded the Stuart Ballantine Medal. Mollenauer was one of the recipients of the 1991 Rank Prize in Optoelectronics. He received the Charles Hard Townes Award in 1997. In 2001, he was the recipient of the Quantum Electronics Award of the IEEE Photonics Society.

He was elected to the National Academy of Engineering in 1993. He was elected a Fellow of Bell Labs in 2001. He was also a fellow of the Optical Society of America.

Mollenauer was co-author with James P. Gordon of the work Solitons in Optical Fibers: Fundamentals and Applications (2006)

Mollenauer died on 28 July 2021.
