= Bill Davidson (American football, born 1915) =

American football player (1915–1970)

No. 12
- Position: Back / End

Personal information
- Born: June 15, 1915; Pittsburgh, Pennsylvania
- Died: August 1, 1970 (aged 55)
- Listed height: 6 ft 0 in (1.83 m)
- Listed weight: 182 lb (83 kg)

Career information
- High school: Mount Lebanon
- College: Temple
- NFL draft: 1937: undrafted

Career history
- Pittsburgh Pirates (1937–1939)

Career NFL statistics
- Rushing yards: 372
- Rush attempts: 155
- Total touchdowns: 4
- Receiving yards: 425
- Receptions: 22
- Games played: 28
- Stats at Pro Football Reference

William A. Davidson (June 15, 1915 – August 4, 1970) was an American professional football back and end who played for three seasons with the Pittsburgh Pirates of the National Football League. He played college football at Temple University for the Temple Owls football team.

== Professional career ==
=== 1937 season ===
Davidson played in all 11 games of the season. In week one, Davidson completed a 19-yard touchdown pass from Johnny Gileda against the Philadelphia Eagles. In week ten, Davidson scored a 68-yard rushing touchdown against the Chicago Cardinals. Davidson finished the season with 293 rushing yards, 1 rushing touchdown, 101 rush attempts and with 4 receptions, 169 receiving yards and 2 receiving touchdowns.

=== 1938 season ===
Davidson played in only 10 out of 14 games in the season. He finished the season with 52 rushing yards, 33 rush attempts 12 receptions and 229 receiving yards.

=== 1939 season ===
Davidson played his final season with 7 out of 14 games. Davidson finished the season with 21 rush attempts, 33 rushing yards, and 6 receptions and 27 receiving yards. Finishing his career with 372 rushing yards, 155 rush attempts, 1 rushing touchdown, 2 receiving touchdowns 425 receiving yards 22 receptions and 1 interception touchdown return.
