= Doug Walgren =

American politician

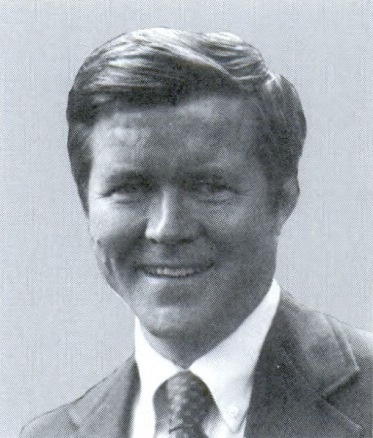

Member of the U.S. House of Representatives from Pennsylvania's 18th district
- In office January 3, 1977 – January 3, 1991
- Preceded by: John Heinz
- Succeeded by: Rick Santorum

Personal details
- Born: Douglas Walgren; December 28, 1940 (age 85) Rochester, New York, U.S.
- Party: Democratic
- Education: Dartmouth College (BA); Stanford University (LLB)

Douglas Walgren (born December 28, 1940) is an American attorney and politician who served as a Democratic member of the U.S. House of Representatives from Pennsylvania from 1977 to 1991.

== Early life ==
Walgren was born in Rochester, New York, and grew up in Mount Lebanon, Pennsylvania. He graduated from Dartmouth College in 1963, and received his LL.B. from Stanford University in 1966. While at Stanford, he roomed off-campus with Dr. K. Barry Sharpless, who went on to be awarded the Nobel Prize for his work in chemistry.

== Legal work ==
Walgren was staff attorney for Neighborhood Legal Services in Pittsburgh, Pennsylvania from 1967 to 1968, and then he engaged in private practice in Pittsburgh from 1969 to 1972. He served as corporate counsel for Behavioral Research Laboratories, Inc. in Palo Alto, California, from 1973 to 1975.

== Congressional career ==
He was elected in 1976 as a Democrat to the 95th and to the six succeeding Congresses. He was an unsuccessful candidate for reelection in 1990. Walgren was defeated by Rick Santorum, who, four years later, was elected Pennsylvania's junior United States senator.

In 1992, during the House banking scandal, Walgren, was found to have bounced 858 checks from the U.S. House bank, some of which were more than 16 months overdue during his time in the congress.

== Sources ==
- United States Congress. "Doug Walgren (id: W000044)". Biographical Directory of the United States Congress.
- The Political Graveyard
- Appearances on C-SPAN

U.S. House of Representatives
| Preceded by John Heinz | Member of the U.S. House of Representatives from Pennsylvania's 18th congressional district 1977–1991 | Succeeded by Rick Santorum |
U.S. order of precedence (ceremonial)
| Preceded by Peter Kostmayer as Former U.S. Representative | Order of precedence of the United States as Former U.S. Representative | Succeeded by Donald L. Ritter as Former U.S. Representative |
