= Vince Lascheid =

American musician (1923–2009)

Vincent C. Lascheid, Jr (December 26, 1923 – March 19, 2009) was a Pittsburgh organist. Lascheid was the organist for the Pittsburgh Pirates from the 1960s to 2009 and from 1970 to 2003 the Pittsburgh Penguins. He was inducted into the Penguins' Hall of Fame in 2003. In 2005, he was honored by being awarded the "Pride of the Pirates" by the Pittsburgh Pirates and with a moment of silence in 2009 from the Pittsburgh Penguins.

Pittsburgh Pirates general manager Joe Brown and Pirates broadcaster Bob Prince met Vince Lascheid while he was playing at the Colony restaurant and nightclub before the opening of Three Rivers Stadium. They asked if he was interested in playing organ at the new stadium, which was the beginning of Vince’s long tenure as organist for the Pirates.

Vince was renowned for his sly and witty association of played song titles with player’s names. Digital recordings of his performances continued to be played at Pirates home games.
