= Todd DePastino =

American author

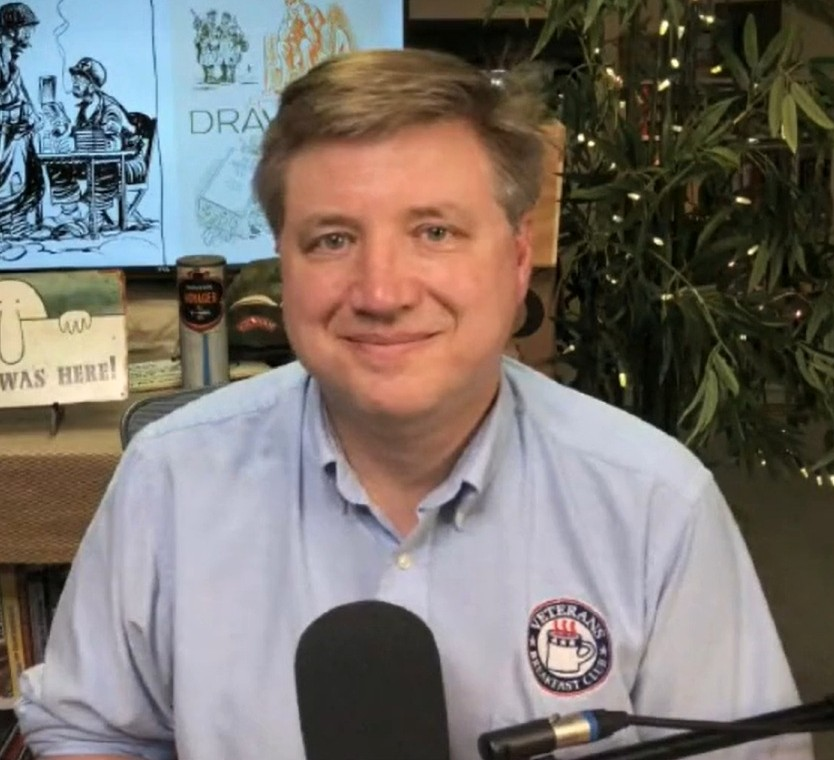
- DePastino in 2021
- Born: Pittsburgh, Pennsylvania, United States
- Education: Boston College MA; Yale University Ph.D. in American History
- Occupations: Author, History professor
- Writing career
- Genre: Historical
- Website: depastino.com

Todd DePastino is an American author and history professor.

== Biography ==
=== Personal life ===
DePastino and his wife Stephanie live in Pittsburgh with their two children.

=== Academic career ===
DePastino teaches at Penn State Beaver.

=== Writing career ===
With the birth of his first daughter in 1996, DePastino became a stay-at-home dad, teaching in the evenings at Penn State Beaver and Waynesburg College while finishing his Ph.D. He then revised his dissertation on the history of homelessness into a book, for which he won a National Endowment for the Humanities Fellowship. The result was Citizen Hobo: How a Century of Homelessness Shaped America (2003).

After editing, annotating, and introducing the lost classic, The Road by Jack London, DePastino plunged into his Bill Mauldin research. Bill Mauldin: A Life Up Front (2008) received strong reviews, was an Eisner Award finalist, and won the Sperber Prize for the best biography of a major media figure. His award-winning double-volume collection of Mauldin's World War II cartoons, Willie & Joe: The WWII Years (2008) was followed in 2011 by Willie & Joe: Back Home, which covers 1945–1946.

Commissioned in Battle: A Combat Infantryman in the Pacific, co-authored by Jay Gruenfled, was released by Hellgate Press in early 2012.

=== Other work ===
DePastino is the director of the Pittsburgh-based Veterans Breakfast Club.

== Works ==
- Bill Mauldin: A Life Up Front, W.W. Norton, 320 pp., 92 illus. ISBN 978-0-393-06183-3
- WILLIE & JOE: THE WWII Years, Fantagraphics Books, 650 pp., ISBN 978-1-56097-838-1
- Citizen Hobo: How A Century of Homelessness Shaped America, University of Chicago Press, 350 pp., 27 illus., ISBN 978-0-226-14378-1
- The Road, By Jack London, Rutgers University Press, 168 pp., 48 illus., ISBN 978-0-8135-3807-5
- WILLIE & JOE: Back Home, Fantagraphics Books, 288 pp., ISBN 1-60699-351-8
- Commissioned in Battle: A Combat Infantryman in the Pacific, WWII, With Jay Gruenfeld, Hellgate Press, 2012. ISBN 1555717004
