= Curt Grieve =

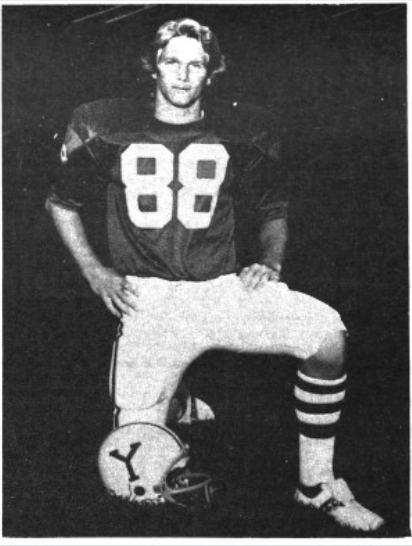

Profile
- Position: Wide receiver

Personal information
- Born: August 23, 1959 (age 67); Hammond, Indiana, U.S.
- Listed height: 6 ft 4 in (1.93 m)
- Listed weight: 195 lb (88 kg)

Career information
- High school: Mount Lebanon (Pennsylvania)
- College: Yale (1978–1981)
- NFL draft: 1982: 6th round, 159th overall pick

Career history
- Philadelphia Eagles (1982)

Awards and highlights
- 1980: Led Ivy League in touchdown catches (8 TDs) 1981: Led Ivy League in touchdown catches (12 TDs), receptions (51), and receiving yards (791 yards)

Curtis Alan Grieve (born August 23, 1959) is an American college football player that played for Yale University. Grieve was born in Hammond, Indiana. Grieve was a wide receiver during his three years at Yale, and after his senior year, Grieve was drafted at 159th overall, or in the 6th round, of the 1982 NFL Draft by the Philadelphia Eagles.

== College career ==
=== Freshman season (1978) ===
In Grieve's first year of college, he played 9 total games, making 5 catches for 74 yards. He did not receive a touchdown. Yale finished the year at 5–2–2 (4–1–2 Conf.)

=== Sophomore season (1979) ===
Grieve did not appear in a game. On Yale's daily newspaper, Grieve said,"I was not having a good time here the first semester of my sophomore year." He continued, "I was spending a great deal of time studying and for me the social life was not the greatest I wondered if being at Yale was worth what it would get me." Grieve later said that, "I wanted to see other areas of the country see other ways of life." Yale finished 1979 at 8–1 (6–1)

=== Junior year (1980) ===
In Grieve's junior year, he made 32 catches (4th in conference) for 580 yards (3rd in conference) and 8 touchdowns, the most in the Ivy League. This season proved that Grieve was a hidden gem, and showed he was fit to be a starter which helped contribute to his outstanding 1981 season. Yale finished the season with an 8–2 (6–1) record.

=== Senior year (1981) ===
In Grieve's final year of college eligiblitiy, he shone. Grieve had 51 receptions, 791 yards, and 12 touchdowns (all 1st in Ivy League). After his outstanding year, many NFL teams became interested in Grieve. After the 1981 year, 18 starters either were drafted or graduated, including Grieve.

Total collegiate stats
Year	Catches	Yards	Touchdowns
1978	5	74	0
1979*	0	0	0
1980	32	580	8
1981	51	791	12
TOTAL	88	1,445	20

*Did not play

== Professional career ==
After Grieve's strong senior year, The Philadelphia Eagles selected Grieve at pick 159 overall in the 6th round of the 1982 NFL Draft. Although Grieve was drafted, he never played a professional game. He was on the IR (injured reserve) during the 1982 NFL season.
