= Warner Slack =

American researcher and academic

Warner Vincent Slack
- Born: June 10, 1933; East Orange, New Jersey
- Died: June 23, 2018 (aged 85)
- Education: Princeton University
- Occupations: Co-founder of Center for Clinical Computing, Beth Israel Deaconess Medical Center; Professor of Medicine, Harvard Medical School
- Known for: Electronic medical records, clinical decision support system,health information technology

Warner Vincent Slack (June 10, 1933 – June 23, 2018) was an American-born physician, biomedical informatician, and pioneer in medical informatics and patient empowerment, known for his contributions to patient-computer dialogue, clinical decision support systems, and electronic medical records. He was a professor of medicine at Harvard Medical School and co-founder of the Center for Clinical Computing at Beth Israel Deaconess Medical Center. His work laid the foundation for modern clinical informatics and patient-centered computing.

== Early life and education ==
Warner Vincent Slack was born in 1933 in East Orange, New Jersey. He earned his Bachelor of Arts degree from Princeton University in 1955 and subsequently attended Columbia University College of Physicians and Surgeons, obtaining his Doctor of Medicine (MD) in 1959.

== Military service ==
During the 1960s, Slack was drafted into the United States Air Force and served as a physician in a Mobile Army Surgical Hospital (M.A.S.H.) unit at Clark Air Force Base in the Philippines.

== Academic career ==
Following his military service, he joined the University of Wisconsin–Madison faculty and held positions in the Departments of Medicine and Computer Science.

At the University of Wisconsin, Slack was instrumental in developing the first computer-based medical history system capable of engaging in an interactive dialogue with patients. This system was among the earliest applications of computers in clinical practice and was the subject of a National Educational Television documentary. His research demonstrated that computer-assisted interviews could elicit more comprehensive medical histories than traditional methods. These findings were published in The New England Journal of Medicine in 1966, in a paper titled "A Computer-Based Medical History System", which became a foundational work in medical informatics.

In 1970, Slack was recruited to Harvard Medical School and Beth Israel Deaconess Medical Center, where he collaborated with Dr. Howard Bleich to establish the Laboratory for Computer Medicine. Together, they developed systems in clinical computing, including early hospital-wide electronic medical records. Without formal institutional approval, they informally designated their unit as the Center for Clinical Computing (CCC), which went on to develop one of the first integrated hospital computing systems. This system became a model for medical institutions worldwide, improving healthcare delivery by integrating patient data across departments.

In addition to hospital computing, Slack was a proponent of patient-centered computing. He developed interactive computer programs that empowered patients to manage their health, including dietary counseling systems.

== Other activities ==
Slack was actively involved in academic publishing. From 1989 to 1998, he served as Editor-in-Chief of MD Computing, publishing more than 45 editorials and research papers. He was also on the editorial boards of Methods of Information in Medicine, Journal of Medical Systems, Computers in Psychiatry and Psychology, Computers in Human Behavior, Methods in Psychiatric Research, and the International Journal of Methods in Psychiatric Research.

In addition to his informatics research, Slack advocated for social justice. In 1966, he co-founded Faculty and Students for Equality, an organization focused on civil rights and social responsibility. He was also an early Physicians for Social Responsibility member and later joined Physicians for Human Rights. Additionally, he served on the Medical Advisory Board for the Juvenile Diabetes Foundation and the Board of Trustees of Lasell College.

== Awards and recognition ==
Slack and Bleich were jointly awarded the Morris F. Collen Award for Excellence by the American College of Medical Informatics (ACMI) in 2001 for their contributions to clinical computing and informatics. The award, considered one of the highest honors in the field, recognized their establishment of the Center for Clinical Computing and their decades of research in patient-computer interaction and hospital-wide computing systems.

In 1995, Slack received the Outstanding Contributions to Society Award from Princeton University. Harvard Medical School honored him by naming a lecture in the Patient-Centered Computing and eHealth course after him. In 2017, Beth Israel Deaconess Medical Center established the Warner Slack Fellowship to support graduate students in clinical informatics.

== Death and legacy ==
Warner Slack died on June 23, 2018. He was recognized for his contributions to medical informatics, with tributes from consumer advocate Ralph Nader.

== Honors and awards ==
- 1986: Founding Fellow, American College of Medical Informatics, 2001
- 1995: Outstanding Contributions to Society Award, Princeton University
- 2001: Morris F. Collen Award of Excellence, American Medical Informatics Association, 2001
