= Frank Cappelli =

American actor

- Born: August 17, 1952; Utica, New York, U.S.
- Died: March 6, 2018 (aged 65); Utica, New York
- Occupation: Television actor

Frank E. Cappelli (August 17, 1952 – March 6, 2018) was an American musician and television actor who was the star of the children's television show Cappelli & Company. He was also a solo singer and recording artist with six releases on the A&M Records label. He played guitar.

Cappelli was born in Utica, New York, and raised from age four in Mt. Lebanon, Pennsylvania.

Cappelli died of a myocardial infarction at age 65 on March 6, 2018.

== Discography ==
All on A&M Records

- Frank Cappelli Says Be Good (1989)
- Look Both Ways (1989)
- On Vacation (1989)
- You Wanna Be a Duck (1989)
- Pass the Coconut (1991)
- Take a Seat (1993)
