= Mt. Lebanon High School =

Public secondary school in Pennsylvania, US

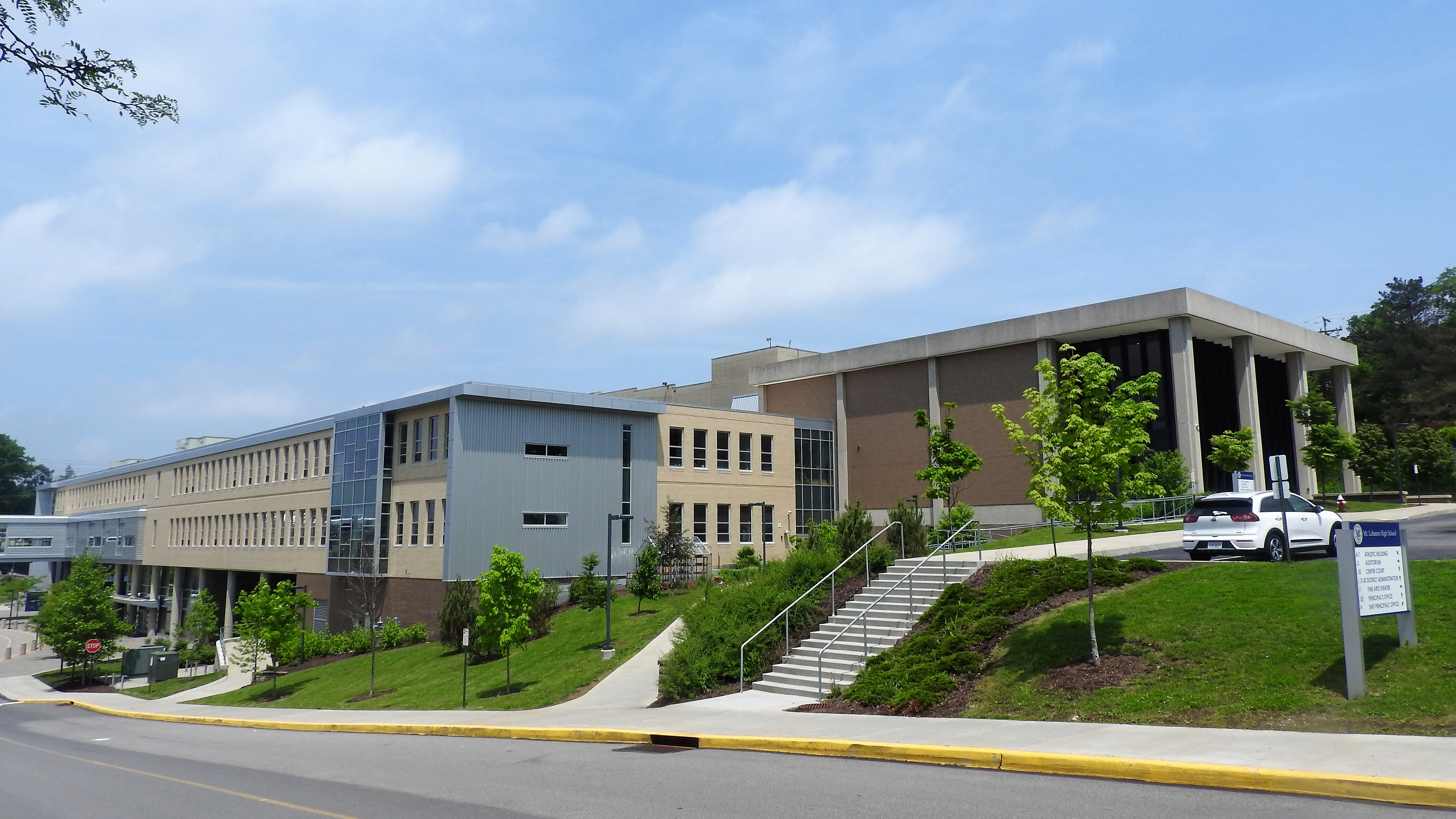

Location
- 155 Cochran Rd, Pittsburgh, PA 15228; Mt. Lebanon, Pennsylvania; United States; 40°22′33″N 80°03′04″W

Information
- Type: Public high school
- Motto: Home Of The Blue Devils
- Established: 1927
- School district: Mt. Lebanon School District
- NCES School ID: 421611000254
- Principal: Joel Thompson
- Staff: 119.80 (FTE)
- Grades: 9–12
- Enrollment: 1,789 (2023–2024)
- Student to teacher ratio: 14.93
- Colors: Blue and Gold
- Mascot: Blue Devil
- Nickname: Lebo, Mt. Lebo
- Newspaper: The Devil's Advocate
- Website: https://hs.mtlsd.org/

Mt. Lebanon High School is a four-year, comprehensive high school located in Mt. Lebanon, Pennsylvania, a suburb of Pittsburgh. It serves as the only high school in the Mt. Lebanon School District and has an enrollment of 1,789 students in grades 9–12 for the 2023–2024 school year. Its mascot is the Blue Devil.

== History ==
The school was originally built in 1927, and was described after being built as one of the most advanced schools in the state. The school had two additions added in 1956 and 1957. Ground was broken in 1970 for an addition, which was completed in 1972. This addition added another six-story building connected to the original building, an arts wing connected to the auditorium, and a new gymnasium. Ninth grade students were later added to the school due to overcrowding at the junior high schools.

In 2012, construction started for the Science Wing and a new Athletic Building that included a new pool, a main gym, two smaller gyms, and an exercise center. Remaining portions of the school that were renovated include the 1930 wing on Cochran Road, the Auditorium, and Fine Arts Wing. These were completed in 2017. In addition, the old South Gym was renovated into the Center Court, which functions as the cafeteria, and is located to be accessible from all main courses.

== Athletics ==
The sports teams compete in the Western Pennsylvania Interscholastic Athletic League - District 7 of the PIAA. The teams go by the name "Blue Devils" and the school mascot is the Blue Devil. The student section is known as the Devil's Den.

Athletic teams at Mt. Lebanon High School are commonly associated and referred to by the colloquial nickname “Lebo,” alongside the school's official Blue Devils mascot identity.

The high school has a sports rivalry with Upper St. Clair High School. The schools are neighboring communities, with Upper St. Clair High School around 3 miles (5 km) south of Mt. Lebanon High School.

In 2021, Mt. Lebanon football coach Bob Palko was awarded the Don Shula NFL High School Coach of the Year Award, following an undefeated season, winning the WPIAL 6A title, and the PIAA 6A state title. Palko led Mt. Lebanon to a spot in the national rankings.

=== PIAA State Championships ===
- Football
  - 1 PIAA state championship (2021)
- Baseball (Boys)
  - 1 PIAA state championship (1998)
- Basketball
  - Boys: 1 PIAA state championship (1940)
  - Girls: 3 PIAA state championships (2009, 2010, and 2011)
- Cross Country
  - Boys: 12 PIAA state titles (1941, 1943, 1944, 1945, 1950, 1952, 1953, 1956, 1957, 1958, 1959, 1998)
- Football
  - 1 PIAA state championship (2021)
- Hockey
  - Boys' Ice: 2 PIHL state championships (1976 and 2006).
- Soccer
  - Boys: 1 PIAA state championship (1981)
  - Girls: 1 PIAA state championship (1992)
- Swimming
  - Girls: 1 PIAA state championship (2002)
- Volleyball
  - Girls: 2 PIAA state titles (1997 and 2000)

== Academics ==
As of 2025, the school's average ACT score for students is a 30, and the school's average SAT score is a 1300.

The school offers 24 AP courses.

== Facilities ==
Mt. Lebanon High School is located on 26 acres in the western Pennsylvania hills. The indoor athletic facilities are connected to the Mt. Lebanon High School Center Court and academic buildings via a glass skybridge, recently named McFeeley Way, after the late high school principal Brian McFeeley.

== Arts and extracurricular activities ==
In the 2002–03 school year, the high school received one of six Outstanding School Awards from the Educational Theatre Association. The school's theater program began in 1930 and has produced a number of notable actors.

In 2006, the fine arts department was rated one of eight finest nationwide by the U.S. Department of Education.

In 2007, the American Music Conference listed Mt. Lebanon High school as one of the "Best 100 Communities for Music Education". Mount Lebanon Percussion ensemble were invited by the NHL to perform at the 2011 NHL Winter Classic on live TV for the country. The Mt. Lebanon Forensic Team won the Western Pennsylvania District Forensic Championship four years in a row, beginning in 2001. In 2004, the team won the state championship in dramatic interpretation and extemporaneous speaking and then earned a second-place title in extemporaneous speaking at the national competition in Salt Lake City. In 2006, the team captured the Pennsylvania High School Speech League championship.

The Devil's Advocate is Mt. Lebanon High School's monthly student newspaper.

== Awards and rankings ==
In 2019, Mt. Lebanon High School received the U.S. Department of Education Green Ribbon School award for its leadership in sustainability and environmental education while promoting health and wellness.

In 2025, the U.S. News & World Report ranked Mt. Lebanon High School the number one high school in the Pittsburgh region, and 7th in Pennsylvania.

== Notable alumni ==
Mt. Lebanon alumni include notable figures in business, politics, entertainment, education, and athletics.
