= List of Pittsburgh Penguins broadcasters =

Broadcasters of American ice hockey team

The following is a list of Pittsburgh Penguins broadcasters for the Pittsburgh Penguins of the National Hockey League.

== Television ==
=== 2020s ===
Year	Channel	Play-by-play	Color commentator(s)	Ice-level reporter	Studio host	Studio analyst(s)
2023–24	SportsNet Pittsburgh	Josh Getzoff	Colby Armstrong (select games); Mike Rupp (select games); Phil Bourque (select games)	Dan Potash (select games); Hailey Hunter (select games)	Rob King	Jay Caufield or Colby Armstrong
2022–23	AT&T SportsNet Pittsburgh	Steve Mears	Bob Errey	Dan Potash	Rob King	Jay Caufield or Colby Armstrong
2021–22	AT&T SportsNet Pittsburgh	Steve Mears	Bob Errey	Dan Potash	Rob King	Jay Caufield or Colby Armstrong
2021	AT&T SportsNet Pittsburgh	Steve Mears	Bob Errey	Dan Potash	Rob King	Jay Caufield or Colby Armstrong

=== 2010s ===
Year	Channel	Play-by-play	Color commentator(s)	Ice-level reporter	Studio host	Studio analyst(s)
2019–20	AT&T SportsNet Pittsburgh	Steve Mears	Bob Errey	Dan Potash	Rob King	Jay Caufield or Colby Armstrong
2018–19	AT&T SportsNet Pittsburgh	Steve Mears	Bob Errey	Dan Potash	Rob King	Jay Caufield or Colby Armstrong
2017–18	AT&T SportsNet Pittsburgh	Steve Mears	Bob Errey	Dan Potash	Rob King	Jay Caufield or Colby Armstrong
2016–17	Root Sports Pittsburgh	Paul Steigerwald	Bob Errey	Dan Potash	Rob King	Jay Caufield or Colby Armstrong
2015–16	Root Sports Pittsburgh	Paul Steigerwald	Bob Errey	Dan Potash	Rob King	Jay Caufield
2014–15	Root Sports Pittsburgh	Paul Steigerwald	Bob Errey	Dan Potash	Rob King	Jay Caufield
2013–14	Root Sports Pittsburgh	Paul Steigerwald	Bob Errey	Dan Potash	Rob King	Jay Caufield
2012–13	Root Sports Pittsburgh	Paul Steigerwald	Bob Errey	Dan Potash	Rob King	Jay Caufield
2011–12	Root Sports Pittsburgh	Paul Steigerwald	Bob Errey	Dan Potash	Rob King	Jay Caufield
2010–11	FSN Pittsburgh; Root Sports Pittsburgh	Paul Steigerwald	Bob Errey	Dan Potash	Rob King	Jay Caufield

=== 2000s ===
Year	Channel	Play-by-play	Color commentator(s)	Ice level reporter	Studio host
2009–10	FSN Pittsburgh	Paul Steigerwald	Bob Errey	Dan Potash	Rob King
2008–09	FSN Pittsburgh	Paul Steigerwald	Bob Errey	—N/a	Rob King
2007–08	FSN Pittsburgh	Paul Steigerwald	Bob Errey		
2006–07	FSN Pittsburgh	Paul Steigerwald	Bob Errey		
2005–06	FSN Pittsburgh	Mike Lange	Bob Errey		
2003–04	FSN Pittsburgh	Mike Lange	Bob Errey		
2002–03	FSN Pittsburgh	Mike Lange	Eddie Olczyk		
2001–02	FSN Pittsburgh	Mike Lange	Eddie Olczyk		
2000–01	FSN Pittsburgh	Mike Lange	Eddie Olczyk		

=== 1990s ===
Year	Channel	Play-by-play	Color commentator(s)	Studio host
1999–2000	Fox Sports Pittsburgh	Mike Lange	Peter Taglianetti	Thor Tolo
1998–99	Fox Sports Pittsburgh	Mike Lange	Paul Steigerwald	Thor Tolo
1997–98	Fox Sports Pittsburgh	Mike Lange	Paul Steigerwald	John Fedko, Derrick Gunn, or Sam Nover
1996–97	Fox Sports Pittsburgh	Mike Lange	Paul Steigerwald	John Fedko, Derrick Gunn, or Sam Nover
1996–97	WPGH-TV	Mike Lange	Paul Steigerwald	John Fedko, Derrick Gunn, or Sam Nover
1996–97	WPTT-TV	Mike Lange	Paul Steigerwald	John Fedko, Derrick Gunn, or Sam Nover
1995–96	KDKA-TV	Mike Lange	Paul Steigerwald	
1995–96	Prime Sports	Mike Lange	Paul Steigerwald	
1994–95	KDKA-TV	Mike Lange	Paul Steigerwald	
1994–95	KBL	Mike Lange	Paul Steigerwald	
1993–94	KDKA-TV	Mike Lange	Paul Steigerwald	
1993–94	KBL	Mike Lange	Paul Steigerwald	
1992–93	KDKA-TV	Mike Lange	Paul Steigerwald	
1992–93	KBL	Mike Lange	Paul Steigerwald	
1991–92	KDKA-TV	Mike Lange	Paul Steigerwald	
1991–92	KBL	Mike Lange	Paul Steigerwald	
1990–91	KDKA-TV	Mike Lange	Paul Steigerwald	
1990–91	KBL	Mike Lange	Paul Steigerwald	

Jake Ploeger and Jeanne Blackburn also hosted Pittsburgh Penguins Confidential, a syndicated weekly half-hour series devoted to the team that was broadcast only on stations in Western Pennsylvania, Eastern Ohio, and Northern West Virginia from 1996 to 1999.

=== 1980s ===
Year	Channel	Play-by-play	Color commentator(s)
1989–90	WPGH-TV	Mike Lange	Paul Steigerwald
1989–90	KBL	Mike Lange	Paul Steigerwald
1988–89	WPGH-TV	Mike Lange	Paul Steigerwald
1988–89	KBL	Mike Lange	Paul Steigerwald
1987–88	WPGH-TV	Mike Lange	Paul Steigerwald
1987–88	KBL	Mike Lange	Paul Steigerwald
1986–87	WPGH-TV	Mike Lange	Paul Steigerwald
1986–87	KBL	Mike Lange	Paul Steigerwald
1985–86	WPGH-TV	Mike Lange	Paul Steigerwald
1984–85	WPGH-TV	Mike Lange	Paul Steigerwald
1983–84	WPGH-TV	Mike Lange	Terry Schiffauer
1982–83	WPGH-TV	Mike Lange	Terry Schiffauer
1981–82	WPGH-TV	Mike Lange	Terry Schiffauer
1980–81	WPGH-TV	Mike Lange	Terry Schiffauer

=== 1970s ===
Year	Channel	Play-by-play	Color commentator(s)
1979–80	WPGH-TV	Mike Lange	Terry Schiffauer
1978–79	WPGH-TV	Jim Forney	
1977–78	WPGH-TV	Bob Prince	Terry Schiffauer
1976–77	WIIC	Sam Nover	Terry Schiffauer
1975–76	WIIC	Sam Nover	
1974–75	WIIC	Sam Nover	Greg Benedetti
1973–74	WIIC	Sam Nover	Greg Benedetti
1972–73	WIIC	Sam Nover	Terry Schiffauer
1971–72	WIIC	Sam Nover	Jack Riley
1970–71	WPGH-TV	Bill Hamilton	John MacDonald

=== 1960s ===
Year	Channel	Play-by-play
1969–70	WTAE-TV/WPGH-TV	Joe Tucker
1968–69	WTAE-TV	Ed Conway
1967–68	WTAE-TV	Ed Conway

== Radio ==
=== 2020s ===
Year	Channel	Play-by-play	Color commentator(s)	Studio host
2023–24	WXDX	Steve Mears	Phil Bourque (most games); Michelle Crechiolo (select games)	Paul Steigerwald
2022–23	WXDX	Josh Getzoff	Phil Bourque	Paul Steigerwald
2021–22	WXDX	Josh Getzoff	Phil Bourque	Paul Steigerwald
2021	WXDX	Mike Lange (home games); Josh Getzoff (away games)	Phil Bourque	Josh Getzoff (home games); Paul Steigerwald (away games)

=== 2010s ===
Year	Channel	Play-by-play	Color commentator(s)	Studio host
2019–20	WXDX	Mike Lange (home games and select away games); Josh Getzoff (select away games)	Phil Bourque	Josh Getzoff (home games and select away games); Paul Steigerwald (select away games)
2018–19	WXDX	Mike Lange (home games and select away games); Josh Getzoff (select away games)	Phil Bourque	Josh Getzoff (home games and select away games); Paul Steigerwald (select away games)
2017–18	WXDX	Mike Lange (home games and select away games); Josh Getzoff (select away games)	Phil Bourque	Josh Getzoff (home games and select away games); Paul Steigerwald (select away games)
2016–17	WXDX	Mike Lange	Phil Bourque	Josh Getzoff
2015–16	WXDX	Mike Lange	Phil Bourque	Josh Getzoff
2014–15	WXDX	Mike Lange	Phil Bourque	Bob Grove
2013–14	WXDX	Mike Lange	Phil Bourque	Bob Grove
2012–13	WXDX	Mike Lange	Phil Bourque	Bob Grove
2011–12	WXDX	Mike Lange	Phil Bourque	Bob Grove
2010–11	WXDX	Mike Lange	Phil Bourque	Bob Grove

=== 2000s ===
Year	Channel	Play-by-play	Color commentator(s)	Studio host
2009–10	WXDX	Mike Lange	Phil Bourque	Steve Mears
2008–09	WXDX	Mike Lange	Phil Bourque	Steve Mears
2007–08	WXDX	Mike Lange	Phil Bourque	
2006–07	WXDX	Mike Lange	Phil Bourque	
2005–06	WWSW	Paul Steigerwald	Phil Bourque	
2003–04	WWSW	Paul Steigerwald	Phil Bourque	
2002–03	WWSW	Paul Steigerwald	Bob Errey	
2001–02	WWSW	Paul Steigerwald	Bob Errey	
2000–01	WWSW	Paul Steigerwald	Bob Errey	

=== 1990s ===
Year	Channel	Play-by-play	Color commentator(s)
1999–2000	WWSW	Paul Steigerwald	Bob Errey
1998–99	WDVE	Matt McConnell	Peter Taglianetti
1997–98	WDVE	Matt McConnell	Peter Taglianetti
1996–97	WTAE	Matt McConnell	Peter Taglianetti
1995–96	WTAE	Doug McLeod	Troy Loney
1994–95	WTAE	Doug McLeod	Stan Savran
1993–94	WTAE	Doug McLeod	Stan Savran
1992–93	KDKA	Mike Lange	Paul Steigerwald
1991–92	KDKA	Mike Lange	Paul Steigerwald
1990–91	KDKA	Mike Lange	Paul Steigerwald

=== 1980s ===
Year	Channel	Play-by-play	Color commentator(s)
1989–90	KDKA	Mike Lange	Paul Steigerwald
1988–89	KDKA	Mike Lange	Paul Steigerwald
1987–88	KDKA	Mike Lange	Paul Steigerwald
1986–87	KDKA	Mike Lange	Paul Steigerwald
1985–86	KDKA	Mike Lange	Paul Steigerwald
1984–85	KDKA	Mike Lange	Paul Steigerwald
1983–84	KQV	Mike Lange	Terry Schiffauer
1982–83	KQV	Mike Lange	Terry Schiffauer
1981–82	KQV	Mike Lange	Terry Schiffauer
1980–81	WWSW	Mike Lange	Terry Schiffauer

=== 1970s ===
Year	Channel	Play-by-play	Color commentator(s)
1979–80	WWSW	Mike Lange	Terry Schiffauer
1978–79	KDKA	Mike Lange	
1977–78	KDKA	Mike Lange	
1976–77	KDKA	Mike Lange	
1975–76	KQV	Garry Morrell	
1974–75	KDKA	Mike Lange	
1973–74	KDKA	Joe Starkey	
1972–73	KDKA	Jim Forney	
1971–72	KDKA	Jim Forney	
1970–71	KDKA	Jim Forney	

=== 1960s ===
Year	Channel	Play-by-play	Color commentator(s)
1969–70	WEEP	Bill Hamilton	
1968–69	WTAE	Beckley Smith	Jim O'Brien
1967–68	WTAE	Ed Conway	

== See also ==
- Pittsburgh Penguins#Broadcasters
- Pittsburgh Penguins Radio Network
- Historical NHL over-the-air television broadcasters
