= Pittsburgh Penguins Radio Network =

Official radio network of the NHL's Pittsburgh Penguins

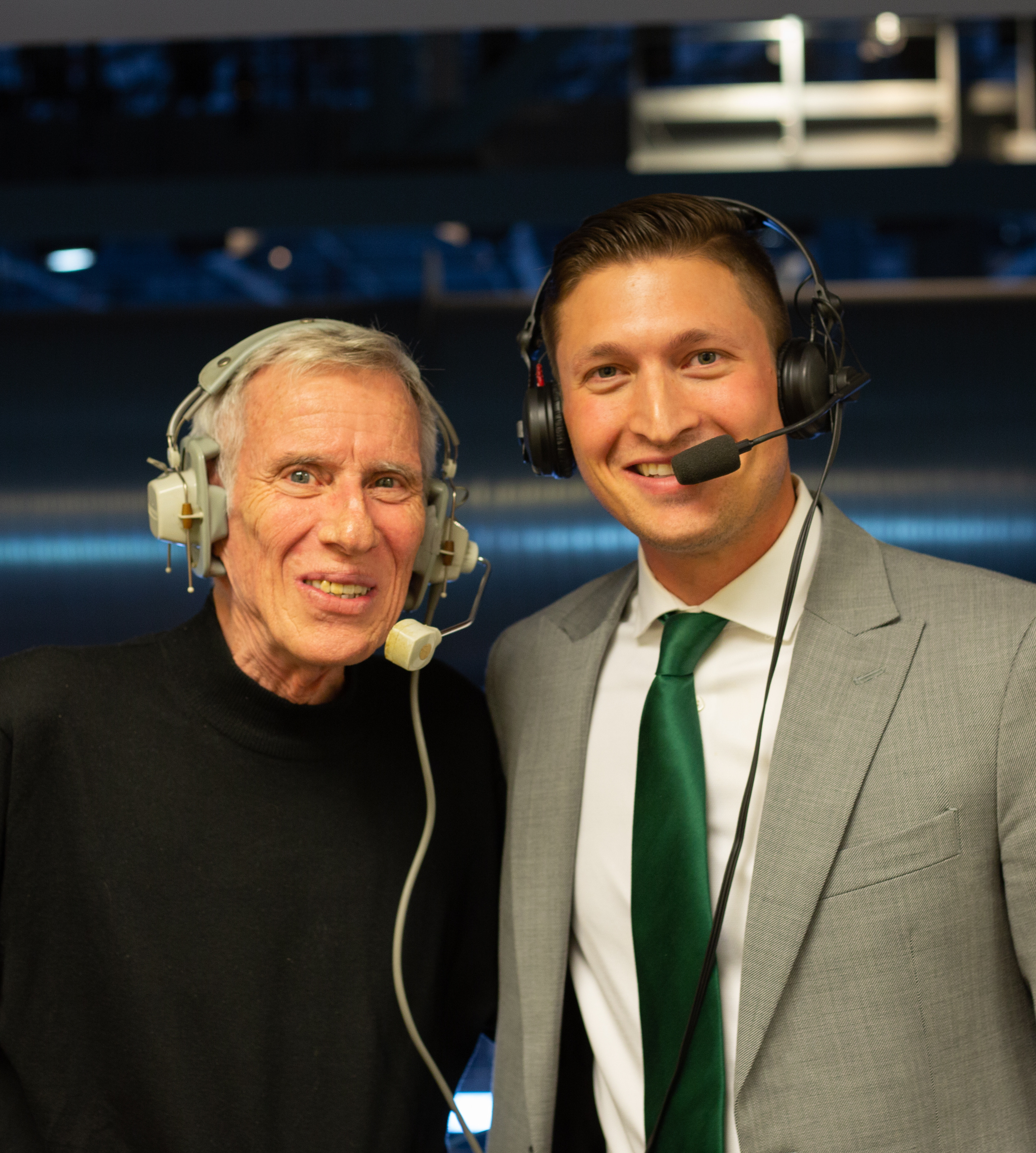
Mike Lange and Josh Getzoff

The Pittsburgh Penguins Radio Network is a radio network operated by the Pittsburgh Penguins of the National Hockey League that provides broadcasts for all the team's games. Josh Getzoff assumed play-by-play duties at the start of the 2021-22 season after the retirement of hall of fame announcer Mike Lange. Former Penguin Phil Bourque is the color commentator. The flagship station since 2006 is WXDX-FM in Pittsburgh.

Mike Lange began doing team radio broadcasts in 1974, and after not working for the team during the 1975–76 year, rejoined the network for the 1976–77 season. He provided play-by-play for radio as well as television when the team began simulcast broadcasts. When the two broadcasts separated in the mid-1990s, Lange worked exclusively on television for FSN Pittsburgh. In 2006, FSN did not renew Lange's contract, and he rejoined the radio network.

Paul Steigerwald worked with the team network from 1980 to 1999. He began with the team in 1980 performing interviews during intermissions. In 1984 he joined Lange as color analyst. When Lange moved to the television broadcast, Steigerwald became the play-by-play announcer. In 2006, Steigerwald replaced Lange at FSN, while Lange replaced Steigerwald on the radio network. Former Penguins Bob Errey served as color commentator following his retirement from playing in 1999. In 2003 when television broadcaster and former player Ed Olczyk became the team's head coach, Errey moved to television. Another former Penguin, Phil Bourque replaced Errey.

In October 2009 the team launched "Pittsburgh Penguins Radio" with WXDX-FM at 105.9 HD2. The station was the first exclusive HD station offered by an NHL team, and only the second among major league teams of any sport ("All Rams Radio" on KLOU-HD2 being the first however being disbanded in 2009). During the first season, content included "Penguins Live" with Steve Mears, a former New York Islanders play-by-play announcer, and Tom Grimm, a former WXDX host; a two-hour simulcast of XM Radio's "NHL Live"; and a one-hour show with WXDX host Mark Madden. The six hours of content was looped continuously, and the station also broadcasts all games. In addition to being available via an HD receiver, the station is also available at the Penguins website. The Stream ended in September 2015 and replaced on HD Radio by iHeart2000s

== Affiliate stations ==
Call sign	Radio frequency	Branding	Market	State
WXDX-FM	105.9 FM	105.9 The X	Pittsburgh	Pennsylvania
WBGG	970 AM	Fox Sports 970/104.7HD2	Pittsburgh	Pennsylvania
WPGB-HD2	104.7-FM2	Fox Sports 970/104.7HD2	Pittsburgh	Pennsylvania
WBVP	1230 AM	Beaver County's Hometown Station	Beaver Falls	Pennsylvania
WHBA	1460 AM	Beaver County's Hometown Station	Ambridge	Pennsylvania
WMBS/W266DB	590 AM/ 101.1 FM	Your Local Station, 590 AM 101.1 FM	Uniontown	Pennsylvania
W266DB	101.1 FM	Your Local Station, 590 AM 101.1 FM	Uniontown	Pennsylvania
WKFO	1380 AM/103.7 FM	103.7 The River	Kittanning	Pennsylvania
WCRO	1230 AM/102.9 FM	Kool 102.9 WCRO	Johnstown	Pennsylvania
WNAE	104.3 FM	Kinzua Country	Warren	Pennsylvania
WISR	680 AM	Butler's Hometown Station	Butler	Pennsylvania
WRIE	1260 AM	Erie Sports Radio	Erie	Pennsylvania
W242CU	96.3 FM	Erie Sports Radio	Erie	Pennsylvania
WDSN	106.5 FM	Sunny 106.5	Dubois	Pennsylvania
WQMU	92.5 FM	U 92.5	Indiana	Pennsylvania
WKQL	103.3 FM	Kool 103.3	Punxsutawney	Pennsylvania
WWCH	1300 AM	Your Hometown Station	Clarion	Pennsylvania
W231DR	94.1 FM	Your Hometown Station	Clarion	Pennsylvania
WKFT	101.3 FM	Your Hometown Station	Strattanville	Pennsylvania
WUZZ	1280 AM	Fox Sports Radio	New Castle	Pennsylvania
WUZZ	1280 AM	Fox Sports Radio	New Castle	Pennsylvania
W248DJ	97.5 FM	Fox Sports Radio	New Castle	Pennsylvania
WKMC	1370 AM/96.1 FM	96.1 Hank FM	Altoona	Pennsylvania
WKQW	1120 AM	Fox Sports 104.1 & 1120	Oil City	Pennsylvania
W281CA	104.1 FM	Fox Sports 104.1 & 1120	Oil City	Pennsylvania
WTBO	1450 AM/97.9 FM	97.9/1450 WTBO	Cumberland	Maryland
WFRB	560 AM	Willie 106.7	Frostburg	Maryland
W294CF	106.7 FM	Willie 106.7	Frostburg	Maryland
WLLF	96.7 FM	Sportsradio 96.7	Mercer	Pennsylvania
WRLF	1490 AM	Buzz 98.3	Fairmont	West Virginia
W252EF	98.3 FM	Buzz 98.3	Morgantown	West Virginia
WEGW	107.5 FM	Eagle 107.5	Wheeling	West Virginia
WHTI	105.7 FM	Hot 105.7	Clarksburg	West Virginia
