= Dan Potash =

American TV sportscaster

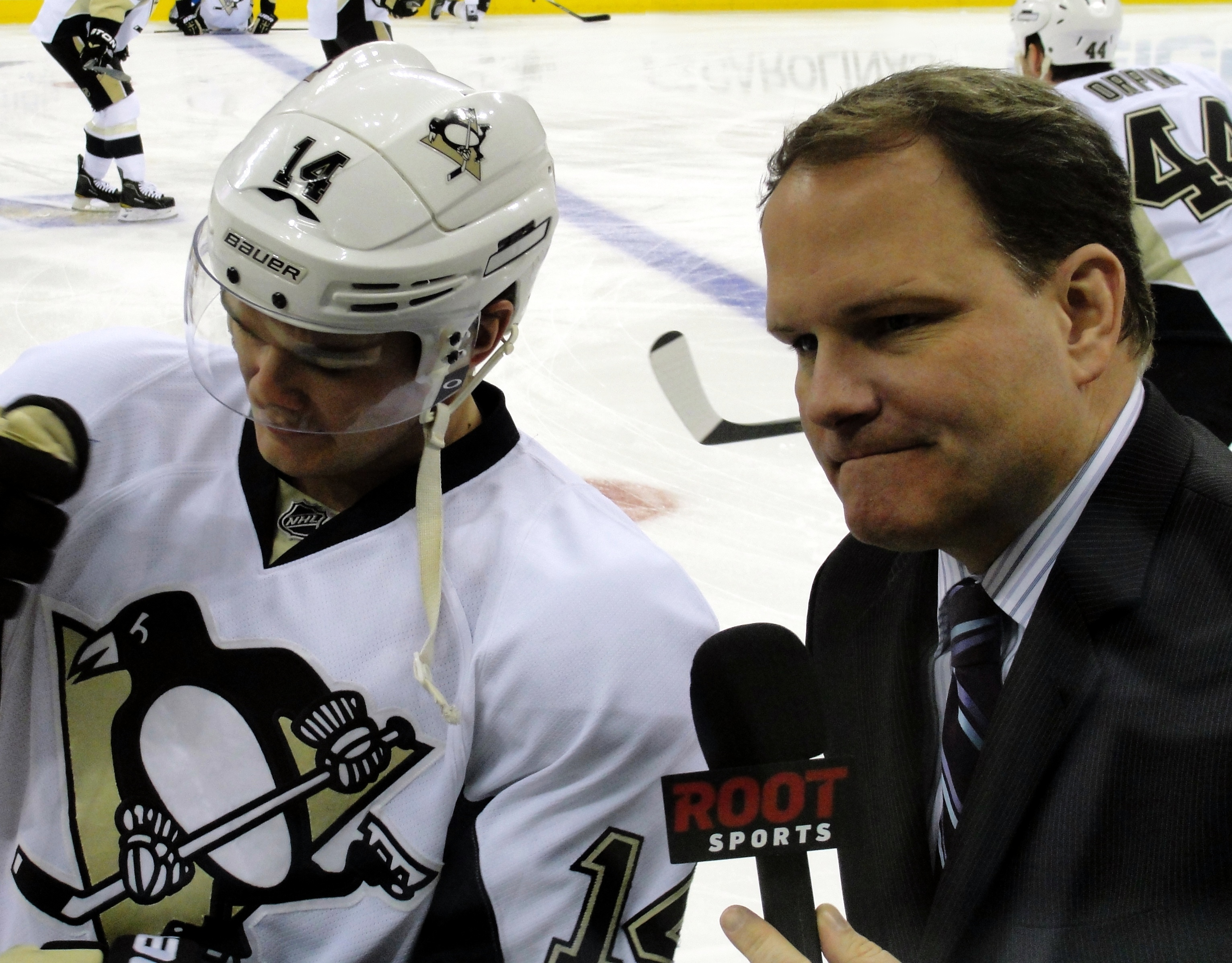
Dan Potash interviews Chris Kunitz, December 2011.

Dan Potash (born March 22, 1970) is a TV reporter for SportsNet Pittsburgh (formerly FSN Pittsburgh, Root Sports Pittsburgh, and AT&T SportsNet Pittsburgh). He covers both the Pittsburgh Penguins of the NHL and the Pittsburgh Pirates of the MLB. He joined the SportsNet Pittsburgh team in 2000. Prior to joining SportsNet Pittsburgh, he worked for three years as a weekend sports reporter for WCIV-TV in Charleston, South Carolina. Before that, Dan served as the sports director at WDTV in Bridgeport, West Virginia. Dan started his sportscasting career in Southern California, where he was a production assistant for Prime Sports. Potash attended Beverly Hills High School in Beverly Hills, California, where he played football.

Potash is well known for an incident in 2008 when then-Penguins player Georges Laraque kissed him during a report. On August 17, 2012, Potash confirmed on the ROOTSPORTSPIT Twitter account that he is now engaged to long-time girlfriend Heidi.

Potash has worked with other notable media personalities such as John Fedko, John Sanders, Patti Burns, Joey Kocur, Stan Savran, Mike Lange, and Adam Curry.

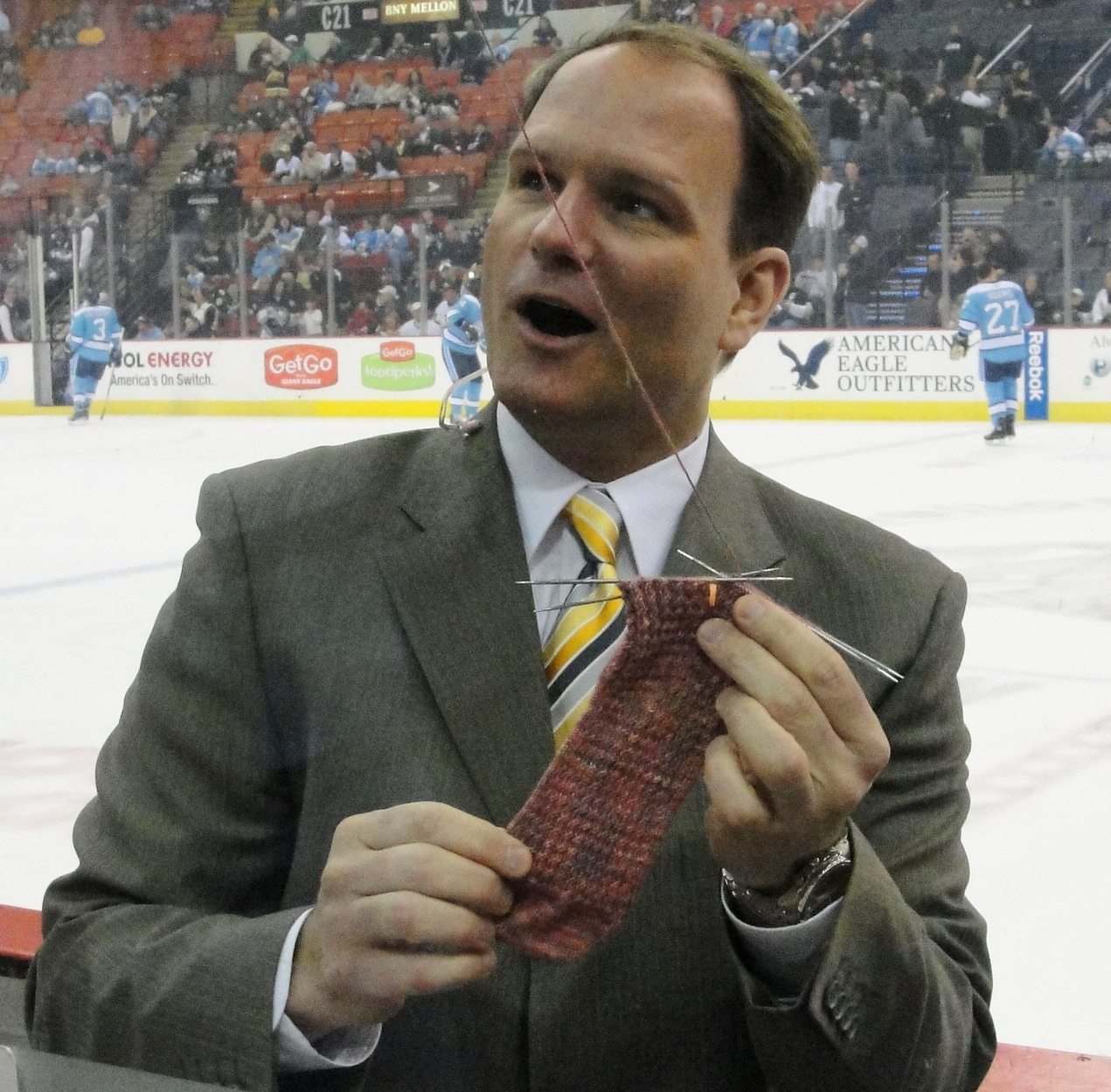
Dan Potash with the Knitting Lady's sock.
