= WBGG (AM) =

Fox Sports Radio affiliate in Pittsburgh

- Pittsburgh, Pennsylvania; United States
- Broadcast area: Pittsburgh metropolitan area
- Frequency: 970 kHz
- Branding: Fox Sports 970/104.7HD2

Programming
- Format: Sports radio
- Affiliations: Fox Sports Radio; Penguins Hockey Network; Pittsburgh Steelers Audio Network; Duquesne Dukes

Ownership
- Owner: iHeartMedia Inc.; (iHM Licenses, LLC)
- Sister stations: WDVE; WKST-FM; WPGB; WWSW-FM; WXDX-FM

History
- First air date: May 31, 1931
- Former call signs: WWSW (1931–1982); WTKN (1982–1988); WWSW (1988–2000)
- Former frequencies: 1500 kHz (1931–1941); 1490 kHz (1941–1949)
- Call sign meaning: Pittsburgh (the second "G" substitutes for the "H")

Technical information
- Licensing authority: FCC
- Facility ID: 59960
- Class: B
- Power: 5,000 watts
- Transmitter coordinates: 40°30′39″N 80°0′27″W
- Repeater: 104.7 WPGB-HD2 (Pittsburgh)

Links
- Public license information: Public file; LMS
- Webcast: Listen live (via iHeartRadio)
- Website: foxsportspgh.iheart.com

WBGG (970 AM) is a commercial radio station licensed to Pittsburgh, Pennsylvania. It carries a sports radio format as the Pittsburgh market affiliate of Fox Sports Radio and a co-flagship of the Pittsburgh Steelers Radio Network. Owned by iHeartMedia, WBGG's studios are located outside Bridgeville, while the station transmitter resides in Ross Township. In addition to a standard analog transmission, WBGG is relayed full-time over the second HD subchannel of WPGB and is available online via iHeartRadio.

== History ==
=== Beginnings as WWSW ===
The station was originally at 1500 (later 1490), and moved to 970 in November 1949, requiring an eight-tower array to use the frequency. This large array was one of the first of its kind in the United States.

For many years, this station was WWSW with a MOR music format aimed at older adults. In the early 1970s, General Manager Charles Warner instituted a news-heavy morning show to compete with market leader KDKA.

=== Country, Talk and Oldies ===
In 1980, two format changes were instituted at WWSW and its sister station, known for the past seven years at WPEZ. The latter switched from Top 40 to adult contemporary music and proved to be a blueprint for its present-day success. As for the former, a disastrous and abrupt format change to country music (as "Double Country") eventually resulted in the abandonment of the historic call sign and a switch to talk as WTKN, with the moniker "We're Talking Pittsburgh!" Legendary Pittsburgh air personality Doug "Uncle Dougie" Hoerth was among the staff hosts under this format, which proved to be no match for the higher rated KDKA and WTAE.

Later, the WWSW call sign was reclaimed. In February 1988, WWSW and sister WWSW-FM simultaneously switched to separate oldies formats, with the FM concentrating more on hits of the 1960s and 1970s, while the AM focused on 1950s and 1960s music. By 1991, the AM became a complete simulcast of the FM station, known as “3WS”, by the end of the decade.

In 1999, WWSW and WDVE bought the rights to broadcast the Pittsburgh Steelers as the team's official flagship stations.

=== As WBGG ===
On August 28, 2000, 970 switched its call sign to WBGG, breaking away from the simulcast to become a Fox Sports Radio affiliate. At first, the station was known as "970 The Burgh," but later, the station called itself "970 ESPN", as it became an affiliate of ESPN Radio.

The two stations had a common bond as, in addition to being co-owned, they were the flagship stations for the Pittsburgh Penguins. The FM outlet for Penguins switched to sister station WXDX-FM in the 2006-07 hockey season while University of Pittsburgh football and basketball switched to WWSW.

In addition, WBGG, along with sister station WDVE, is the flagship station for the Pittsburgh Steelers. While WDVE originates the broadcast, the contract with the Steelers specifies that the games also be aired on an AM radio station in the market. WBGG also airs additional Steelers insider programming from Steelers Nation Radio.

Steelers Nation Radio programming is highlighted by The Steelers Blitz, hosted by Tom Opferman and Vince Williams; In The Locker Room, hosted by Rob King, Willie Colon, and Max Starks; The Steelers Report, hosted by Ed Troup and Brian Batko; and The Drive, hosted by Wes Uhler and Matt Williamson. Local beat writers Tim Benz, Gerry Dulac, and Chris Adamski also contribute to Steelers coverage on the station. Former Steelers Tunch Ilkin and Craig Wolfley and longtime Pittsburgh sportscaster Stan Savran were mainstays of the station’s lineup and Steelers coverage until their passings.

On January 1, 2011, WBGG became an affiliate of the ESPN Radio Network as WEAE changed to Radio Disney.

On September 9, 2015, it was announced that WBGG Pittsburgh launched an FM translator station, W292DH, located at 106.3, licensed to Uniontown. That translator was sold late in 2020 to Catholic broadcaster Relevant Radio.

For the past several years, WBGG has served as the flagship station of the Duquesne Dukes, airing football, men’s basketball, and coaches shows throughout the season.

During the season for the NHL's Pittsburgh Penguins, the station broadcasts a weekly Monday night show called Along the Boards, hosted by Pittsburgh Post-Gazette Penguins beat writer Josh Yohe and Penguins radio color analyst and former player Phil Bourque.

Since January 2024, WBGG has carried Fox Sports Radio programming.

== Previous logo ==
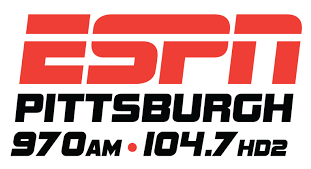
