= SportsNet Pittsburgh =

Regional sports network

- Country: United States
- Broadcast area: Western, Central and Northwestern Pennsylvania; West Virginia; Eastern Ohio; Western Maryland; Southwestern New York; Worldwide (via satellite)
- Headquarters: Pittsburgh, Pennsylvania

Programming
- Language: English
- Picture format: 720p (HDTV); 480i (SDTV)

Ownership
- Owner: Fenway Sports Group; Pittsburgh Baseball, Inc
- Sister channels: NESN

History
- Launched: April 13, 1986; 40 years ago
- Former names: Pirates Cable Network (1986); KBL Entertainment Network (1986–1995); Prime Sports KBL (1995–1996); Fox Sports Pittsburgh (1996–1999); Fox Sports Net Pittsburgh (1999–2004); FSN Pittsburgh (2004–2011); Root Sports Pittsburgh (2011–2017); AT&T SportsNet Pittsburgh (2017–2023)

Links
- Website: sportsnetpittsburgh.com

Availability

Streaming media
- DirecTV Stream: Internet Protocol television
- FuboTV: Internet Protocol television

SportsNet Pittsburgh (SNP) is an American regional sports network serving Greater Pittsburgh and western Pennsylvania. Jointly owned by Fenway Sports Group and Bob Nutting via the Pittsburgh Penguins and Pittsburgh Pirates respectively, it serves as the regional broadcaster of both teams. It is headquartered in Pittsburgh, Pennsylvania, with some of its operations handled from the facilities of sister network NESN in Watertown, Massachusetts.

The channel was first launched by Tele-Communications Inc in April 1986 as the KBL Entertainment Network, which featured a mixture of sports and entertainment programming. After being transferred to TCI subsidiary Liberty Media, KBL was rebranded as part of its Prime Sports chain of regional sports networks in 1994, and subsequently became a charter member of Fox Sports Net upon its establishment in 1996.

After a corporate restructuring that brought Liberty's networks under DirecTV, the channel was rebranded as Root Sports Pittsburgh in 2011, and then AT&T SportsNet Pittsburgh under the AT&T SportsNet brand after DirecTV was acquired by AT&T. In 2023, Warner Bros. Discovery announced that it would sell or shut down its regional sports networks: in August 2023, it was announced that the Penguins would acquire the network and rebrand it as SportsNet Pittsburgh in October 2023, with NESN—a sister via the Penguins' parent company Fenway Sports Group—assuming day-to-day operations. Prior to their 2024 season, the Pirates also acquired a stake in the network.

As of August 2023, SportsNet Pittsburgh is available on cable providers throughout nearly all of Pennsylvania (outside the Philadelphia market), almost all of West Virginia, western Maryland, eastern Ohio, southwestern border areas of New York and Ashland, Kentucky, reaching more than 2.4 million homes; it is also available in the Columbus, Ohio, market through DirecTV Stream, though Penguins broadcasts are blacked out due to the presence of the Columbus Blue Jackets. It is also available nationwide on satellite via DirecTV.

== History ==
The channel launched on April 13, 1986, as Pirates Cable Network, exclusively serving the Pittsburgh metropolitan area; its first sports event telecast on that date was a Major League Baseball game between the Pittsburgh Pirates and Chicago Cubs from Three Rivers Stadium, announced by Mike Lange, in which the Pirates shut out the Cubs, 8–0.

The network commenced full-time broadcasts on April 24, 1986, as the KBL Entertainment Network, in order to allow other sports besides the Pirates to be included on the network. Its first regular broadcast was a Pirates home game against the New York Mets. The network was initially owned by Tele-Communications Inc. (now part of Comcast), then the largest cable television provider in the Pittsburgh market. KBL quickly expanded its cable coverage. As early as May 9, 1986, its cable footprint roughly approximated its present six-state coverage area.

While it primarily carried sports-related programming, KBL also served as a general entertainment cable channel while under TCI ownership, essentially filling the void left after independent station WPGH-TV (channel 53) became a charter affiliate of the Fox Broadcasting Company seven months after KBL's debut. It aired children's programming for part of the day, including reruns of the John Candy animated series Camp Candy.

In 1994, TCI transferred the channel to its corporate parent Liberty Media; KBL then immediately dropped all entertainment programming and converted the renamed Prime Sports KBL into an affiliate of Prime SportsChannel America, a partnership between Liberty's Prime Network and the Cablevision/NBC-owned SportsChannel America regional sports network groups. In 1995, Prime Network's retail subsidiary, Prime Sports Merchandising, purchased some sports apparel stores located inside shopping malls and rebranded them as Prime Sports Shops, promoting them on its networks including KBL.

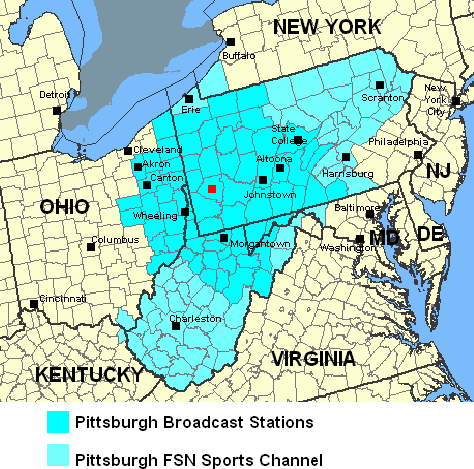
Map of SportsNet Pittsburgh coverage area, taken during its tenure as a Fox Sports Networks-branded outlet.

In 1996, News Corporation, which formed a sports division for the Fox network two years earlier after it obtained the broadcast rights to the National Football Conference and sought to create a group of regional sports networks, acquired a 50% interest in the Prime Network from TCI parent Liberty Media. Later that year on November 1, News Corporation and Liberty Media relaunched the Prime Network affiliates as part of the new Fox Sports Net group, with Prime Sports KBL officially rebranding as Fox Sports Pittsburgh. The deal temporarily ended the Prime SportsChannel partnership, although News Corporation subsequently acquired most of the SportsChannel networks the following year; the retail stores, meanwhile, retained the "Prime Sports" name for many years after the rebranding of the regional networks as part of Fox Sports Net. The channel was rebranded as Fox Sports Net Pittsburgh in 2000, as part of a collective brand modification of the FSN networks under the "Fox Sports Net" banner; subsequently in 2004, the channel shortened its name to FSN Pittsburgh, through the networks' de-emphasis of the "Fox Sports Net" brand.

On December 22, 2006, News Corporation sold its interest in FSN Pittsburgh and sister networks FSN Utah, FSN Northwest and FSN Rocky Mountain to Liberty Media, in an asset trade in which News Corporation also traded its 38.5% ownership stake in satellite provider DirecTV for $550 million in cash and stock, in exchange for Liberty Media's 16.3% stake in the company. On May 4, 2009, DirecTV Group Inc. announced it would become a part of Liberty's entertainment unit, part of which would then be spun off into the separate company under the DirecTV name, in a deal in which Liberty would increase its share in DirecTV from 48% to 54%, with Liberty owner John Malone and his family owning a 24% interest. DirecTV would operate its newly acquired FSN-affiliated networks through DirecTV Sports Networks, a new division formed when the split off from Liberty Media was completed on November 19, 2009.

On December 17, 2010, DirecTV Sports Networks announced that its four Fox Sports Networks-affiliated regional outlets would be relaunched under the "Root Sports" brand. The network officially rebranded as Root Sports Pittsburgh on April 1, 2011, coinciding with the start of the 2011 Major League Baseball season. For nominal purposes, the Root Sports networks continued to carry programming distributed mainly to the Fox Sports regional networks to provide supplementary sports and entertainment programming. On April 8, 2016, DirecTV Sports Networks rebranded under the AT&T name as AT&T Sports Networks.

On June 12, 2017, AT&T Sports Networks announced that the network, along with Root Sports Southwest, and Root Sports Rocky Mountain, would rebrand as AT&T SportsNet with the channel becoming AT&T SportsNet Pittsburgh. All network programming and on-air talent remained intact, with the exception of Paul Steigerwald, who was replaced in October 2017 by Steve Mears as the play-by-play announcer of the Penguins. The name change took effect on July 14, 2017.

In July 2019, it was reported that AT&T was looking to sell its regional sports networks to reduce debt related to its acquisition of Time Warner, as well as rolling out 5G on its cell phone networks. Two potential suitors included Sinclair Broadcast Group, which had acquired Fox Sports Networks (with Entertainment Studios) amid the acquisition of 21st Century Fox by Disney (and already had a decades-long presence in the Pittsburgh market as the owners of WPGH-TV/WPNT), as well as NBCUniversal, which owns regional networks via its NBC Sports division, and whose parent company Comcast is the cable provider in Pittsburgh.

On October 1, 2021, AT&T SportsNet Pittsburgh, along with sister networks AT&T SportsNet Rocky Mountain, and Root Sports Northwest, was removed from Dish Network satellite and Sling streaming TV services.

On February 24, 2023, Warner Bros. Discovery announced plans to exit the RSN business, informing the teams that AT&T Sports Networks would file for chapter 7 bankruptcy unless deals were made for them to exit or take over the channels. Root Sports Northwest was not affected, as it is majority-owned by the Seattle Mariners. While originally setting a deadline of March 31, it later reached an agreement to keep the networks operational through at least the end of the 2023 Major League Baseball season. As Fenway Sports Group had recently acquired the Penguins, it was speculated by sportswriters that the channel could be taken over by the company in conjunction with its Boston-area network NESN. On August 31, 2023, it was announced that AT&T Sportsnet Pittsburgh would be acquired by Fenway Sports Group via the Pittsburgh Penguins, and would be rebranded as SportsNet Pittsburgh on October 2. NESN would handle the day-to-day operations of the network.

It was initially uncertain whether the Pirates would continue to be televised by the channel, with sportswriters citing potential conflict of interest concerns with FSG being the parent company of a competing MLB team, the Boston Red Sox. On December 13, 2023, the Pirates announced that they had acquired a stake in SportsNet Pittsburgh, and confirmed that it would remain the team's home beginning in the 2024 season. Team president Travis Williams stated that Major League Baseball was not worried about any conflict of interest concerns.

On April 29, 2024, the network launched SNP 360 as its over-the-top streaming platform. Modelled after NESN 360, the service allows viewers to stream live and video on-demand content and event coverage. It is available at no additional charge to SportsNet Pittsburgh subscribers on television providers, and sold as a direct-to-consumer subscription service priced at $17.99 per-month.

== Programming ==
SportsNet Pittsburgh carries Pittsburgh Penguins hockey, Pittsburgh Pirates baseball, and other area professional, collegiate, and high-school sporting events. To fill out its schedule outside local sports, the network carries live coverage of the Professional Women's Hockey League, college ice hockey, and the British Basketball League, as well as tape-delayed coverage of pro footvolley, kickboxing, poker, MMA, boxing, padel, jai alai, and World Chase Tag. The network also airs golf programming, sports betting programs, Savannah Bananas baseball, regional outdoor programming, and several documentary and discussion-based shows, including Sports Stars of Tomorrow and In Depth with Graham Bensinger.

=== Professional sports ===
==== Pittsburgh Penguins ====
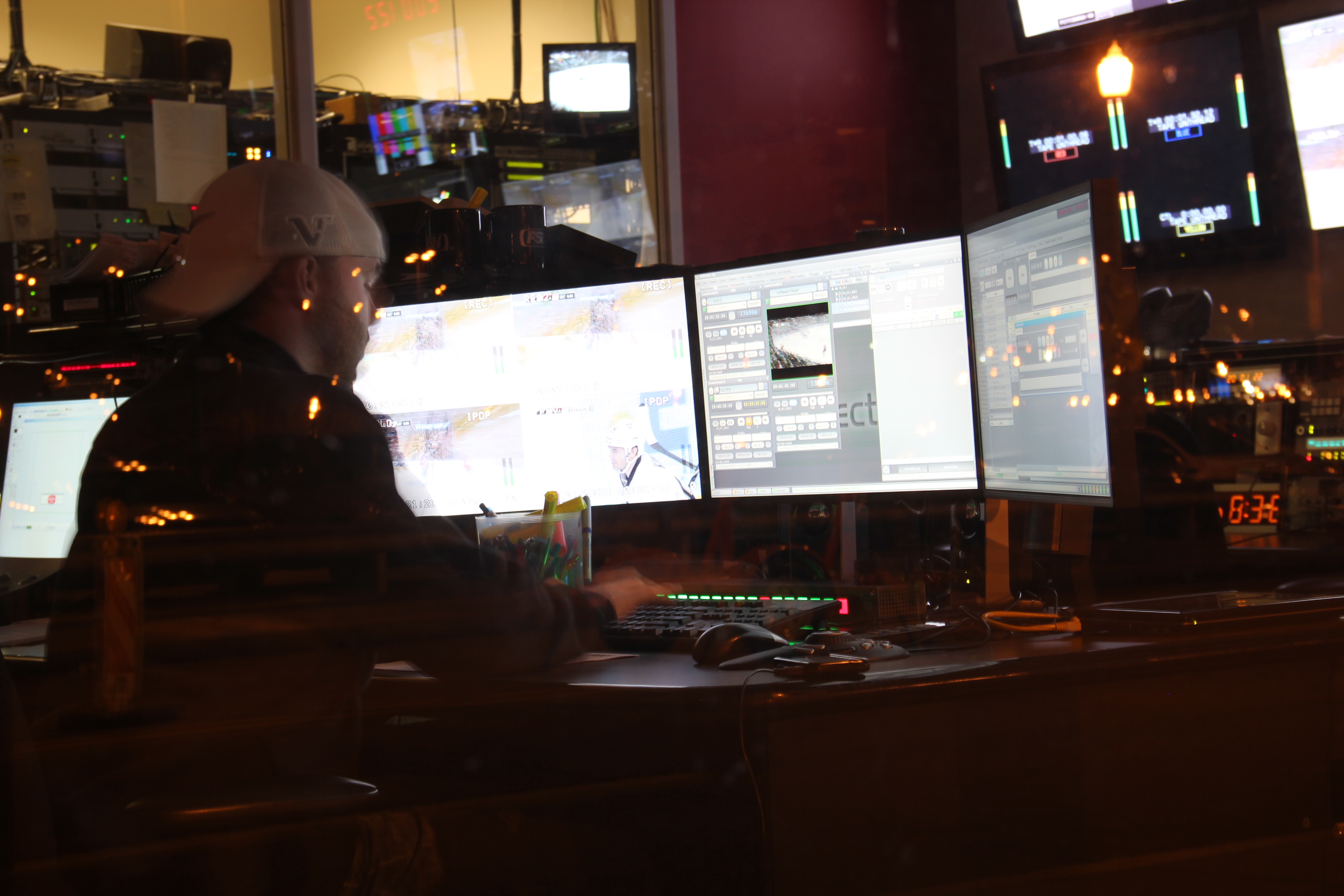
Root Sports technicians during a November 19, 2011, game between the Pittsburgh Penguins and Florida Panthers.

SportsNet Pittsburgh maintains exclusive regional rights to most regular season and any early-round Stanley Cup playoff games involving the NHL's Pittsburgh Penguins; it also carries pre- and postgame coverage and Penguins-related programs such as classic game re-airs, historical programming, Penguins in 2 (condensed game replays), Inside Penguins Hockey, The Raw Tapes, and Penguins Game Plan.

On April 27, 2011, the network reached a contract extension with the Penguins, allowing the network to continue carrying most of the team's NHL game telecasts through the end of the 2028–29 NHL season.

==== Pittsburgh Pirates ====
The network holds the regional cable television rights to the Pittsburgh Pirates of Major League Baseball, carrying over 150 regular season and Spring training games annually, as well as pre- and postgame coverage, rebroadcasts of recent games (as part of Pirates Instant Replay), classic game re-airs, and the team analysis program Inside Pirates Baseball presented by Allegheny Health Network.

From the 2013 to 2018 seasons, Sportsnet's telecasts of Pirates games were blacked out on DirecTV in many portions of the Pirates' claimed territory, including the Columbus, Ohio, market, for reasons not released publicly. Despite the blackout, DirecTV did not allow Pirates games to be shown in the blacked-out area on its MLB Extra Innings package. The blackout was lifted in time for the 2019 season.

==== Pittsburgh Passion ====
Sportsnet’s partnership with the Pittsburgh Passion of the Women’s Football Alliance began in the late 2000’s. Telecasts were initially condensed game replays, showing highlights of the previous game in a fast-paced, one-hour time window. As of 2024, the Passion have returned to the network after a decade-long hiatus.

==== Pittsburgh Steelers ====
The network formerly served as the cable home of the NFL's Pittsburgh Steelers, broadcasting team-related magazine and analysis programs such as weekly press conferences held by coach Mike Tomlin during the regular season and the team coach's show The Mike Tomlin Show (both were hosted by Stan Savran). This continued through the 2016 season. KDKA-TV now airs The Mike Tomlin Show, while Tomlin's Tuesday press conference is no longer televised live. Although regular Steelers coverage is no longer part of the network's lineup, team documentary programming continues to air from time to time, usually focused on historical figures such as Art Rooney and Chuck Noll. National NFL content from VSIN and Pro Football Weekly is also aired by SportsNet Pittsburgh.

==== Pittsburgh Riverhounds SC ====
Beginning with the 2024 season, Sportsnet airs select matches from the Pittsburgh Riverhounds SC of the USL Championship. The network shares the local broadcast rights to the Riverhounds with CBS owned independent station WPKD-TV (KDKA+).

==== NBA Basketball ====
As Pittsburgh does not have an NBA team of its own, SportsNet Pittsburgh carries select Saturday and holiday regular season NBA games during the Basketball season, with the Cleveland Cavaliers and Philadelphia 76ers the most frequent.

=== Minor league sports ===
==== Wilkes-Barre/Scranton Penguins ====
The network currently serves as the cable home of the AHL's Wilkes-Barre/Scranton Penguins, broadcasting weekend home games during the regular season. Prior to the network acquiring the rights to the games, the team had no television coverage in either Pittsburgh's or Wilkes-Barre's DMAs.

==== Indianapolis Indians ====
Sportsnet airs select games featuring the Indianapolis Indians, the Triple-A minor league affiliate of the Pirates.

==== Altoona Curve ====
Sportsnet airs select games featuring the Altoona Curve, the Double-A minor league affiliate of the Pirates.

=== College sports ===
==== Current programming ====
- West Virginia Mountaineers coaches shows, football and basketball pregame shows
- The Penn State Football/Basketball Story, football and basketball pregame shows
- Pittsburgh Panthers coaches shows, football and basketball pregame shows
- Duquesne Dukes football, men's and women's basketball and coaches shows
- Robert Morris Colonials football, men's basketball, men's and women's ice hockey
- Northeast Conference football, men's and women's basketball
- Mountain East Conference men's and women's basketball tournaments, as well as occasional regular season broadcasts of football and basketball
- Syndicated coverage of men's and women's ice hockey from various schools and conferences, with the Central Collegiate Hockey Association via FanDuel Sports Network on Fridays the most frequent.

==== Former programming ====
SportsNet Pittsburgh formerly carried the exclusive rights to the West Virginia Mountaineers, carrying all football and men's basketball games not picked up by a national network, as well as select women's basketball games, select other live events (women's soccer, baseball, etc.), and the football team's weekly Tuesday press conferences. Although the network lost rights to the live events portion of their WVU coverage to ESPN+ beginning with the 2020-2021 season, a coaches show involving all Mountaineer sports and Mountaineer Gameday Live, a live pregame show for Mountaineer football and men's basketball, still air on the channel.

Similarly, the network formerly carried football, men's and women's basketball, and other events featuring the Pittsburgh Panthers, which were produced first by ESPN Regional Television and later by Fox Sports South and Raycom Sports once the Panthers moved to the ACC. Additionally, the network aired a number of Panthers-related insider programs, including Pat Narduzzi's weekly press conferences, The Pat Narduzzi Show with Larry Richert, and the magazine program Beyond The Script, which was hosted by the network's Rob King. The partnership ended following the 2020-21 athletic year.

Additional collegiate programming formerly carried by SportsNet has included:

- Syndicated coverage of ACC, Atlantic 10, Big 12, Big East, Big Sky, Big Ten, Conference USA, Northeast Conference, Pac-12, Patriot League, WAC and West Coast Conference athletics (most notably football and men’s and women’s basketball)
- Marshall Thundering Herd, Notre Dame Fighting Irish, Penn State Nittany Lions, and Villanova Wildcats insider programming
- ACC, Big 12, Big East, and Conference USA weekly magazine shows
- Three Rivers Classic hockey tournament coverage

=== High school & youth sports ===
West Virginia Secondary School Activities Commission high school football, baseball, softball, and boys' and girls' basketball championship games, as well as occasional broadcasts of regular-season WVSSAC football contests, are carried by SportsNet Pittsburgh.

The network is the regional home of the annual PONY League World Series, which is held locally in Washington County, Pennsylvania. Former Pirates' play-by-play announcer Lanny Frattare calls most games.

SportsNet also provides extensive coverage of Pittsburgh-area high school athletics. Notable events broadcast by the network include the Pittsburgh City League boys’ and girls’ basketball championships, the Penguins Cup, and the Serra Catholic Baseball Invitational. The network also provides coverage of Western Pennsylvania Interscholastic Athletic League (WPIAL) boys' and girls' regular season basketball.

Until 2019, WPIAL regular season, playoff, and championship football games were a network staple. WPCW took over the rights to all 6 championship games in 2018, and the rights to additional playoff and regular season games in 2019.

=== Studio programming ===
The network provides live pre- and postgame coverage for all Penguins and Pirates games, including games aired on other networks. With the sale of the network to Fenway Sports Group, pre- and postgame coverage has been expanded from 30 minutes to an hour before and after each game, as of October 2023.

Since 2021, SportsNet has served as the local affiliate of VSIN's Follow The Money, a 3-hour sports betting program that airs weekdays from 7-10am. Additional content from VSIN was added in the fall of 2023, including The Lombardi Line and betting-oriented NFL and college football gameday programming. Previously, the network aired simulcasts of Audience Network's The Rich Eisen Show and The Dan Patrick Show in similar time slots.

Throughout the previous 2 decades, locally-produced studio programming has been drastically reduced from nightly programs to pre- and postgame coverage only. Savran on SportsBeat, Pittsburgh Sports Tonight, and live Steelers coverage are just some of the local studio shows that were cancelled during the network's ownership under Liberty Media in the late 2000s. Nationally distributed Fox Sports studio shows also aired in both live and tape-delay until they were moved to Fox Sports 1 upon its 2013 launch.

== On-air staff ==
=== Current on-air staff ===
==== Pittsburgh Penguins ====
- Josh Getzoff - Play-by-play announcer
- Colby Armstrong - color commentator
- Phil Bourque - color commentator (select games)
- Katie Florio - rinkside reporter/studio anchor (select games)
- Dan Potash - studio anchor/rinkside reporter (select games)
- Mike Rupp - studio analyst/color commentator (select games)
- Jay Caufield - studio analyst
- Bryan Trottier - studio analyst
- Matt Bartkowski - studio analyst
- Ryan Malone - studio analyst

==== Pittsburgh Pirates ====
- Greg Brown – play-by-play announcer
- Joe Block - play-by-play announcer
- Hannah Mears - field reporter
- Rob King - studio host
- Kevin Young - color commentator
- Matt Capps - color commentator
- Michael McKenry - color commentator and studio analyst
- Bob Walk - color commentator
- Neil Walker - color commentator
- John Wehner - color commentator
- Steven Brault - studio analyst
- Jordy Mercer - studio analyst
- Alex Presley - studio analyst

==== College sports ====
- Tim Benz - basketball and ice hockey play-by-play announcer
- Josh Taylor - basketball play-by-play announcer
- Alex Panormios - football and basketball play-by-play announcer
- Ellis Cannon - Duquesne men’s basketball color commentator
- Rachel Zimmerman - Duquesne women’s basketball color commentator
- Mike Prisuta - Robert Morris men’s ice hockey color commentator

==== Studio anchors ====
- Dan Potash
- Katie Florio
- Rob King

=== Notable former on-air staff ===
==== Pittsburgh Penguins ====
- Mike Lange – play-by-play announcer (later with the Pittsburgh Penguins Radio Network; died on February 19, 2025)
- Paul Steigerwald – play-by-play announcer (now with the communications and marketing department of the Penguins' front office and the Penguins Radio Network)
- Bob Errey – color commentator (now with NHL Network)
- Peter Taglianetti – color commentator
- Eddie Olczyk – color commentator (now with NHL on TNT and the Seattle Kraken)
- Steve Mears – play by play announcer (now with the Columbus Blue Jackets)
- Hailey Hunter - rinkside reporter/studio anchor

==== Pittsburgh Pirates ====
- Tim Neverett – play-by-play announcer (now with the Los Angeles Dodgers)
- Lanny Frattare – play-by-play announcer (semi-retired, currently the play-by-play announcer for PONY League World Series telecasts)
- Steve Blass – color commentator (retired after 2019 Pirates' season)
- Ken Macha – studio analyst
- Kent Tekulve – studio analyst (retired after 2017 Pirates' season)
- Lacee Collins – field reporter
- Robby Incmikoski - field reporter
- Aly Cohen - studio host

==== West Virginia University ====
- Warren Baker – men's basketball color commentator (now with ESPN+)
- Marc Bulger – football color commentator
- Mike Logan – football color commentator
- Rasheed Marshall – football color commentator
- Meg Bulger – football sideline reporter (still occasionally appears on the network as a sideline reporter for Mountain East basketball)

==== High school football ====
- Chris Schneider – color commentator
- Craig Wolfley – color commentator
- Rich Walsh – sideline reporter (now with KDKA-TV)

==== Studio anchors and analysts ====
- Stan Savran – host of SportsBeat, Penguins and Pirates pregame shows (died in June 2023)
- Guy Junker – co-host of SportsBeat (later with WTAE-TV; now Pirates public address announcer)
- Paul Alexander – now with KDKA-AM & KDKA-FM
- Ryan Burr – now with the Golf Channel
- Trenni Casey – now with NBC Sports Boston
- Marshall Harris – later with WBBM-TV in Chicago
- Brent Stover – now with Big Ten Network
