= Paul Steigerwald =

American sportscaster (born 1954)

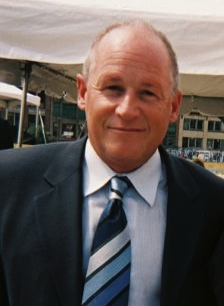
- Steigerwald in 2010
- Born: August 6, 1954 (age 71); Scott Township, Allegheny County, Pennsylvania
- Other name: Staggy
- Occupation: Sportscaster
- Relatives: John Steigerwald (brother); Bill Steigerwald (brother); Danny Stag (brother)

Paul Steigerwald (born August 6, 1954) is an American sportscaster, who through the 2016–17 NHL season first worked as the Pittsburgh Penguins' color commentator and then the TV play-by-play announcer on Root Sports Pittsburgh (now SportsNet Pittsburgh).

== Minor leagues ==
Steigerwald became a hockey fan growing up in Pittsburgh's South Hills. One of his neighbors was Pittsburgh Penguins general manager Jack Riley, who would provide tickets for the poorly attended games. Steigerwald developed an interest in hockey and played at the club level while attending Kent State University. After graduating, Steigerwald started his broadcast career with the Johnstown Red Wings of the Eastern Hockey League. WJNL, the local radio affiliate of the Johnstown Red Wings paid Steigerwald $110 a week to provide commentary for all 70 games that season. The Eastern Hockey League later folded the following year.

Steigerwald was later the radio play-by-play announcer for the Altoona Curve, the AA affiliate of the Pittsburgh Pirates, from 2005 to 2007.

== Pittsburgh Penguins ==
The Penguins hired Steigerwald as their marketing director at age 25, and he became their TV and radio color commentator in 1985. FSN Pittsburgh (now SportsNet Pittsburgh) hired him on June 29, 2006, as its TV play-by-play announcer after it declined to renew the contract of fellow Penguins broadcaster Mike Lange, who was later hired by the team exclusively as its radio play-by-play announcer. Steigerwald denied persistent rumors that he worked behind the scenes to secure Lange's dismissal. On August 18, 2011, Steigerwald and color analyst Bob Errey were re-signed by Root Sports to multi-year contracts. During a Penguins/Capitals game on March 19, 2013; two fans were spotted with a large picture of Steigerwald on a stick. Errey referred to the prop as "Steigy on a Stick," which became an instant viral hit with Penguins fans.

On May 16, 2017, Root Sports and the Pittsburgh Penguins announced that, starting in the 2017-18 hockey season, Steigerwald would transition to the Penguins' front office in a new role with the communications and marketing department. Steve Mears replaced Steigerwald as the network's TV play-by-play broadcaster for Penguins games.

== Cameo ==
Steigerwald appeared in the Jean-Claude Van Damme action movie Sudden Death. Playing himself alongside Mike Lange, he provided commentary for a hockey game during which Van Damme's character fought off terrorists.

== Personal life ==
He is the brother of fellow Pittsburgh sports media member, John Steigerwald, former Pittsburgh Post-Gazette reporter and Pittsburgh Tribune-Review libertarian columnist Bill Steigerwald, and blues rock guitarist Danny Stag.

He was raised, and continues to live, in the Pittsburgh suburb Mt. Lebanon, Pennsylvania.

Media offices
Preceded by Terry Schiffauer	Pittsburgh Penguins TV/radio color commentator 1984–1999	Succeeded by Stan Savran (radio); Peter Taglianetti (television)
Preceded by Matt "Mad Dog" McConnell	Pittsburgh Penguins radio play-by-play announcer 1999–2006	Succeeded by Mike Lange
Preceded by Mike Lange	Pittsburgh Penguins television play-by-play announcer 2006-2017	Succeeded by Steve Mears
