= Ed Conway =

British journalist, currently Sky News Economics Editor

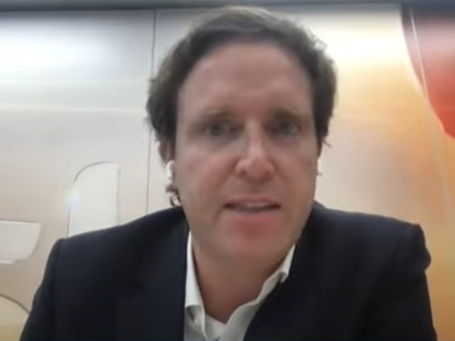
- Speaking at the World Economic Forum's Sustainable Development Summit 2021
- Born: Edmund Conway; 1979 (age 46–47)
- Education: The Oratory School; Pembroke College, Oxford; John F. Kennedy School of Government
- Occupation: Economics editor
- Years active: 2003–present
- Employer: Sky News

Edmund Conway (born 1979) is an English journalist who is the Economics Editor of Sky News, the 24-hour television news service operated by Sky Group. He is based at Sky Central in Osterley in West London. He is a former correspondent for the Daily Mail newspaper and the Economics Editor of The Daily Telegraph and the Sunday Telegraph newspapers. He became Sky News' first Economics Editor in 2011.

== Education ==
From 1993 to 1998, Conway was educated at The Oratory School, a Roman Catholic boarding independent school for boys in the village of Woodcote in Oxfordshire, followed by Pembroke College, Oxford, where he took an MA in English, and after having worked for several years, gained a Fulbright Scholarship to the Kennedy School of Government at Harvard University in the United States, where he took an MPA (a master's degree in Public Administration).

== Life and career ==
Conway was formerly an economics correspondent for the Daily Mail newspaper, followed by the Economics Editor of The Daily Telegraph and the Sunday Telegraph newspapers.

In August 2011, Conway joined Sky News as economics editor and covered topics including financial market crisis Great Recession and euro crisis. He is also known for his numerous stories including a G20 summit, Greek default and its rescue fund. Among his many interviewees are the managing director of the International Monetary Fund, Christine Lagarde, the Chancellor of the Exchequer, Philip Hammond, and the Bank of England Governor Mark Carney. During the early stages of the 2008 financial crisis, he was the first to reveal the Bank of England's plans to create additional money through quantitative easing, and to warn of the funding gap in the banking system which later led to the collapse of Northern Rock.

== Publications ==
Conway is the author of 50 Economics Ideas You Really Need to Know, first published in September 2009. The book has been translated into thirteen languages.

In May 2014, he published The Summit: The Biggest Battle of the Second World War - fought behind closed doors.

In 2023, he published Material World: A Substantial Story of Our Past and Future, which was shortlisted for the Financial Times Business Book of the Year Award that year. In 2024, Material World was also shortlisted for the British Academy Book Prize.

Trade World is due to be published in September 2026.

Media offices
New creation	Economics Editor: Sky News; 2011–present	Incumbent
