= Matt McConnell =

American sportscaster

Matt McConnell is an American sports broadcaster and is currently the play-by-play announcer for Utah Mammoth.

== Early life ==
McConnell was born in Gary, Indiana. While he spent most of his childhood in Indiana, his father's job with U.S. Steel resulted in the family relocating to Minnesota and Pittsburgh. McConnell graduated from Mt. Lebanon High School in 1981 and earned his Bachelor's degree in Telecommunications at Michigan State University. While living in Pittsburgh, McConnell became a fan of the Pittsburgh Penguins and especially idolised Mike Lange.

== Announcing career ==
=== NHL ===
McConnell got his start in the NHL as the radio play-by-play announcer for the Mighty Ducks of Anaheim, a position which he held from 1993 to 1996.

At the end of 1996, he joined the Pittsburgh Penguins as their radio play-by-play announcer.

In 1999, he joined the Atlanta Thrashers as the team's first-ever TV play-by-play announcer, a position which he held from 1999 to 2003, and returned to from 2009 to 2011.

From 2004 to 2006 he served as the Minnesota Wild TV play-by-play announcer. McConnell has also covered the NHL playoffs for NHL Radio and Westwood One.

In 2011 he was named the play-by-play announcer for the Arizona Coyotes. In 2013, he was named "Arizona Sports Broadcaster of the Year" by the National Sports Media Association. In 2020 and 2021, he was named a finalist for the same award. At the conclusion of the 2024 NHL season the Arizona Coyotes suspended operations.

In September 2024 McConnell was named the play-by-play announcer for the Utah Mammoth, the newest team in the NHL, consisting of the assets of the former Arizona Coyotes.

=== College sports ===
McConnell also has served as the lead play-by-play announcer for CBS College Sports Network college hockey broadcasts. He also covered college basketball, college football and college lacrosse.

=== World Juniors ===
McConnell served as the play-by-play announcer for NHL Network coverage of the 2009 World Junior Ice Hockey Championships.
