= Pittsburgh Penguins Confidential =

US television program

Pittsburgh Penguins Confidential, sometimes called Pens Confidential, was a Pittsburgh, Pennsylvania based half-hour TV sports series that aired on various local stations throughout Western Pennsylvania, Eastern Ohio, and Northern West Virginia. Its main subject was the Pittsburgh Penguins, the National Hockey League franchise in Pittsburgh. The show ran from 1996 until 1999 and was hosted by Jake Ploeger and Jeanne Blackburn.

== Segments ==
The first segment was always called the Starter Rewind, which showed highlights of the previous week's games.

Segment number two was known as Inside Hockey, and was always sponsored by Giant Eagle. This segment took viewers inside the game itself.

Another segment was called the BP Flashback, which took viewers on a time machine ride into the team's history.

Segments during the last part of each episode included Hockey Tips, where Penguins players and on-ice personnel taught some of the basics of the game to the viewers. The final segment was Viewer email, where Jake and Jeanne read emails sent by viewers to the players.

== Outreach ==
The show aired on various local stations around the tri-state area, and were aired on either a Saturday or a Sunday. The shows were even shown on the Jumbotron at the Civic Arena before pre-game warmups at Penguins games.

A sampling of the stations that aired the show included WPXI in Pittsburgh, WYTV in Youngstown, Ohio, and WTOV in Steubenville, Ohio.
