= Jay Caufield =

American ice hockey player (born 1960)

- Born: July 17, 1960 (age 66) Philadelphia, Pennsylvania, U.S.
- Height: 6 ft 4 in (193 cm)
- Weight: 237 lb (108 kg; 16 st 13 lb)
- Position: Right wing
- Shot: Right
- Played for: New York Rangers; Minnesota North Stars; Pittsburgh Penguins
- NHL draft: Undrafted
- Playing career: 1985–1994

John Jay Caufield (born July 17, 1960) is an American former ice hockey right winger. He played in the National Hockey League with the New York Rangers, Minnesota North Stars, and Pittsburgh Penguins from 1987 to 1993. With the Penguins, he won the Stanley Cup in 1991 and 1992.

== Early life ==
Caufield was born in Philadelphia, Pennsylvania, and was raised in the Towamencin Township, Pennsylvania, area about a mile outside Lansdale borough. He graduated from North Penn High School.

== Playing career ==
During the 1979-80 hockey season, Caufield played junior hockey for the Milton Flyers of the OHA-B. The next season, he later attended Hibbing Community College, where he played hockey. Following the season, Caufield went to the University of North Dakota, where he played football and one hockey game during the 1984–85 season. He later signed with the New York Rangers in 1985 and was assigned to the Toledo Goaldiggers of the IHL.

Caufield played 13 games with the Rangers in the 1986–87 season, accumulating 45 penalty minutes.

The Rangers traded Caufield prior to the 1987–88 season, when he played 65 games for the Kalamazoo Wings.

With the Pittsburgh Penguins, Caufield played most of five seasons, including on their 1991–92 Stanley Cup-winning team. He averaged nearly four penalty minutes a game, and in 194 games with Pittsburgh he scored three goals. He was demoted to the IHL for 1993–94 and retired at the end of the season.

== Later life ==
After he retired as a hockey player, Caufield made a brief appearance as the Penguins' goalie, Brad Tolliver, in the hockey-themed action film Sudden Death. He also became a personal trainer, working extensively with Mario Lemieux during his NHL comebacks. Currently, Caufield works as an analyst on Penguins Pregame, Intermission & Postgame on SportsNet Pittsburgh.

== Career statistics ==
=== Regular season and playoffs ===
			Regular season					Playoffs
Season	Team	League	GP	G	A	Pts	PIM	GP	G	A	Pts	PIM
1979–80	Milton Flyers	COJHL	42	16	29	45	50	—	—	—	—	—
1980–81	Hibbing C.C.	NJCAA	—	—	—	—	—	—	—	—	—	—
1983–84	University of North Dakota	WCHA	—	—	—	—	—	—	—	—	—	—
1984–85	University of North Dakota	WCHA	1	0	0	0	0	—	—	—	—	—
1985–86	Toledo Goaldiggers	IHL	30	5	4	9	54	—	—	—	—	—
1985–86	New Haven Nighthawks	AHL	42	2	3	5	40	1	0	0	0	0
1986–87	New York Rangers	NHL	13	2	1	3	45	3	0	0	0	12
1986–87	Flint Spirits	IHL	12	4	3	7	59	—	—	—	—	—
1986–87	New Haven Nighthawks	AHL	13	0	0	0	43	—	—	—	—	—
1987–88	Minnesota North Stars	NHL	1	0	0	0	0	—	—	—	—	—
1987–88	Kalamazoo Wings	IHL	65	5	10	15	273	6	0	1	1	47
1988–89	Pittsburgh Penguins	NHL	58	1	4	5	285	9	0	0	0	28
1989–90	Pittsburgh Penguins	NHL	37	1	2	3	123	—	—	—	—	—
1990–91	Pittsburgh Penguins	NHL	23	1	1	2	71	—	—	—	—	—
1990–91	Muskegon Lumberjacks	IHL	3	1	0	1	18	—	—	—	—	—
1991–92	Pittsburgh Penguins	NHL	50	0	0	0	175	5	0	0	0	2
1992–93	Pittsburgh Penguins	NHL	26	0	0	0	60	—	—	—	—	—
1993–94	Kalamazoo Wings	IHL	45	2	3	5	176	4	0	0	0	18
NHL totals			208	5	8	13	759	17	0	0	0	42

== Awards and achievements ==
- 1991 Stanley Cup championship (with Pittsburgh)
- 1992 Stanley Cup championship (with Pittsburgh)
