= John Fedko =

American sportscaster

John Fedko is a semi-retired American television sportscaster. He is the former sports director and anchor for Channel 11 Pittsburgh (WPXI). Fedko also reported for Channel 11 News at 6 and 11 pm, and hosted the Fedko Fone Zone, a local sports call-in show on Pittsburgh Cable News Channel (PCNC).

Fedko was voted "Pittsburgh's favorite sportscaster" by Pittsburgh Magazine. He is especially popular during high school football season. In 1995, he was the second-most recognizable personality in Pittsburgh, two percentage points behind KDKA-TV's Patti Burns. Friday night football is still known as John Fedko's Skylights, which is a staple product of WPXI-TV.

== Biography ==
Fedko was born in Lawton, Oklahoma to John and Catherine Fedko. He has three sisters. The family moved to Harrisburg, Pennsylvania in 1972, where he attended Trinity High School in Camp Hill. In 1977, Fedko's family moved to Orange County, California, and Fedko entered the University of California, Irvine, but later transferred to University of Southern California where he majored in journalism.

He lives in Pittsburgh with his wife, Tina. They have five children, Kaley, Christian, Kyler, Katherine, and Colby.

=== Career ===
Fedko began creating home skits at the age of nine. In his early twenties, Fedko sought to become a celebrity by moving into television. Fedko became a TV weatherman and sportscaster in the Midland–Odessa metropolitan area. When the sports director died, Fedko was promoted to sports director at the age of 23. Fedko next moved to KAMR in Amarillo, Texas, then Milwaukee, then finally to Pittsburgh.

Fedko announced his semi-retirement from broadcasting in December 2010, to spend more time with his family. After stepping away from his regular on-camera duties at WPXI, Fedko assumed the role of the President of the Vincentian Academy on July 1, 2011. He held this role for over five years until the academy relieved him from his role as they sought to step away from the president-principal model that had been in place for many years. Fedko's term as president officially ended on November 1, 2016.
