= WPGB =

Coordinates: 40.4723°N 79.9945°W

- Pittsburgh, Pennsylvania; United States
- Broadcast area: Pittsburgh metropolitan area
- Frequency: 104.7 MHz (HD Radio)
- Branding: Big 104.7

Programming
- Format: Country music
- Subchannels: HD2: WBGG simulcast (Sports)
- Affiliations: Premiere Networks

Ownership
- Owner: iHeartMedia, Inc.; (iHM Licenses, LLC)
- Sister stations: WBGG, WDVE, WKST-FM, WWSW-FM, WXDX-FM

History
- First air date: 1967
- Former call signs: WYDD (1967–1989); WNRJ (1989–1990); WEZE (1990–1991); WORD (1991–1993); WXRB (1993–1995); WNRQ (1995–1996); WJJJ (1996–2004)
- Call sign meaning: Disambiguation of Pittsburgh, with the "BG" later re-adapted to stand for "big"

Technical information
- Licensing authority: FCC
- Facility ID: 18511
- Class: B
- ERP: 14,500 watts
- HAAT: 232 meters (761 ft)

Links
- Public license information: Public file; LMS
- Webcast: Listen Live
- Website: big1047.iheart.com

WPGB (104.7 MHz) is a commercial FM radio station in Pittsburgh, Pennsylvania. It broadcasts a country music format and is owned by iHeartMedia, Inc. Its studios and offices are located on Abele Rd. in Bridgeville next to I-79, along with its sister stations. WPGB carries The Bobby Bones Show on weekday mornings, syndicated from Nashville.

WPGB has an effective radiated power (ERP) of 14,500 watts. The transmitter is off Rising Main Avenue at Lanark Street, on a tower shared with WPXI-TV and other FM stations in the Pittsburgh radio market. WPGB broadcasts using HD Radio technology. Its HD2 digital subchannel carries the sports radio programming of co-owned WBGG (970 AM).

== History ==
=== Beginnings as WPGH ===
Though the station first signed on the air as WYDD in 1967, its roots can be traced back to 1963 on 100.7 FM as WPGH and under the ownership of Gateway Broadcasting Enterprises, which also owned New Kensington-licensed AM station WKPA (now WMNY). 100.7 was also (and still is) licensed to New Kensington.

Gateway owner Nelson L. Goldberg was interested in acquiring an improved FM signal with Pittsburgh market penetration. That opportunity presented itself in 1967, when a channel opened up for 104.7. To acquire the new signal, Goldberg had to spin off WPGH, which was purchased by Milton Hammond and moved to Millvale, where it was rechristened as big-band formatted WNUF-FM. That station is known today as WBZZ.

=== As WYDD ===
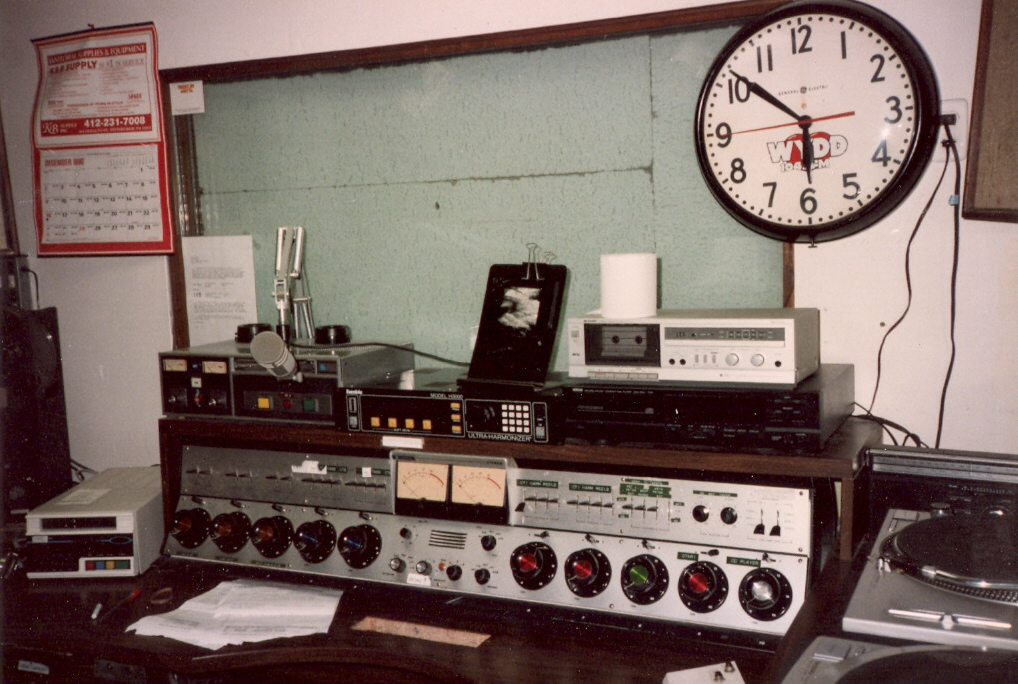
WYDD on-air studio at 810 Fifth Avenue in New Kensington from the early 1970s until 1989, when this studio was converted to production use only. Note the iconic and sometimes legendary WYDD's Heart with headphones logo from the early 1980's on the clock's face. WYDD had switched its call letters to WNRJ and moved into a more state-of-the-art studio that year. The studios were finally moved to Greentree in 1991.

104.7 adopted the WPGH call letters, and soon afterwards, the station changed to a full-time jazz format changing its call letters to WYDD meaning The WYDE World of Pittsburgh, using an elongated globe as its logo. A fragment of the jazz format remained as "Jazz Impressions", a weekend specialty smooth jazz show that premiered in 1976. The station would then move to a more freeform/progressive AOR format throughout the 1970's, which would then shift into a Top 40/CHR format from 1977 all the way to 1989. Throughout their run as a Top 40/CHR station, WYDD used monikers, mottos, and slogans like; WYDD 104.7 FM, Pittsburgh's Heartbeat!, 104 FM WYDD, The Heart Beats for You!, 104.7 WYDD, Metro Music, New Hits, For a New Attitude, and Power 104.7 WYDD, Pittsburgh's Power Station!

The Stephen King book "Christine" (but not the movie of the same name) was set in a fictional suburb of Pittsburgh and mentioned both 104.7 WYDD and their legendary Block Party Weekend segments multiple time, the "WYDD's Block Party Weekend" was an hour of playing of multiple songs by the same artist back-to-back featuring the WYDD's MetroMix and then later renamed as the WYDD's PowerMix.

=== As WNRJ ===
On May 17, 1989, at 7:30 pm, the station became known as Energy 105, and brought about the call letter change to WNRJ. Before the changeover, the station manager at the time, Bob Hank, executed an early viral marketing plan by playing the song "What's on Your Mind (Pure Energy)" by Information Society non-stop in a loop for 25 1/2 hours – focusing on a repeat of the "Pure Energy" sample from Leonard Nimoy as Star Trek's Mr. Spock. The marketing stunt caused listeners to call emergency services concerned that some calamity befell the DJs and other station employees. Hank told reporters he was only trying to draw attention to the station's switch in format and new call letters. "We were just trying to draw a little bit of attention," Hank said. "We never dreamed it would go this far."

"Energy" was led by former WABC program director; consultant Rick Sklar, and WYDD program director Tony Florentino. Among the talent hired for "Energy" was New York City native Mike Frazer, who remained in Pittsburgh and has been a part of WWSW since 1990. The format was successful in terms of ratings, but quickly became too costly to maintain.

One of the chief competitors between Top 40 station WBZZ (then known as B94, now KDKA-FM) and AOR-formatted WDVE, the station maintained a fairly consistent lineup until its sale to Salem Communications in 1989, ending more than two decades of local ownership.

WYDD had its main studio located along with WKPA in New Kensington since its beginnings, but maintained a separate sales office at Gateway Towers in Pittsburgh for many years.

=== As WEZE ===
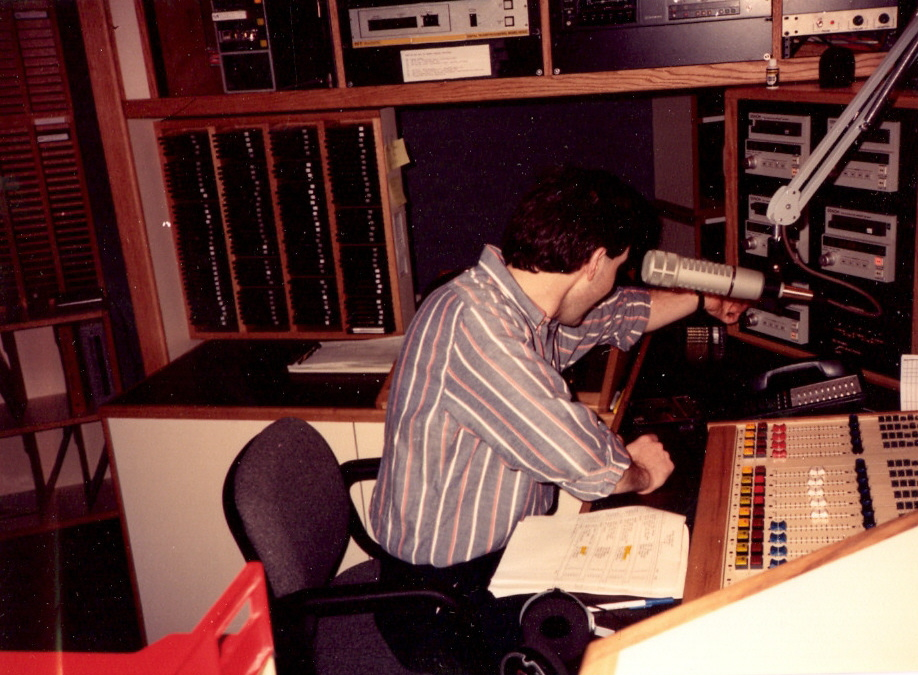
Announcer at the controls of the new WEZE on-air studio at Seven Parkway Center, Suite 625 in Greentree, April 1991. This location is now the main on-air studio for WORD-FM 101.5

Gateway Broadcasting Enterprises had initially agreed to sell WYDD and its sister station WKPA to Salem Communications in 1987, but legal complexities between the two companies delayed the finalization to the end of December 1989. While initially reporting that WNRJ would keep its format, Salem officials announced the following month that the station would switch to an easy listening format, an unusual move at a time when established easy-listening stations were migrating towards soft adult contemporary music.

The call letters were switched to WEZE, shared by Salem's co-owned AM station in Boston, and the easy-listening format was adopted on January 15, 1990, with the intent to switch from that format to Christian talk once the ministry contracts could be obtained. In April 1991, the studios were moved to Green Tree borough, located in Pittsburgh's South Hills, to Seven Parkway Center, Suite 625, one floor below WLTJ. The tower site was then moved later that same year from Murray Hill Road in East Deer Township (which was also half of WKPA's two-tower directional antenna array) to 750 Ivory Avenue, just off I-279 in Pittsburgh, the home of WPGH-TV. The much higher tower location allowed a power reduction to 13 kW, but a decades-long coverage problem for the southern suburbs of Pittsburgh was finally alleviated.

=== As WORD-FM ===
In October 1991, Salem Communications completed its intended format switch to Christian Talk, mirroring the format adopted by its co-owned stations, and adopting the call sign WORD-FM. This station continues today at 101.5 FM.

=== As WXRB ===
After years of negotiations, the opportunity to purchase heritage Christian stations WPIT and WPIT-FM finally presented itself to Salem Communications. Salem purchased the station in early 1993, and though now legally permitted to hold 104.7 (thanks to duopoly) in addition to WPIT and WPIT-FM, Salem chose to spin off 104.7 to Entercom, licensee of WDSY-FM and the former WEEP. WPIT and WPIT-FM's facilities were moved to Greentree, and 104.7's operations were moved to WPIT's longtime home in downtown Pittsburgh at Gateway Towers, where it was joined by WEEP and WDSY. Both stations would remain there for about five years, until all three stations were split off and sold to three different owners. Operations for 104.7 would move temporarily to One Allegheny Square in Pittsburgh, and then finally to 200 Fleet Street in Greentree.

After Entercom purchased the station, and after stunting briefly with a classic rock format as "US 104.7", on February 2, 1993, 104.7 changed to country, branded as 104.7 The Rebel, WXRB. The station was to complement WDSY and WEEP, who targeted an older audience, while WXRB targeted a younger audience with its "Young Country" direction, which was very popular during that time due to a recent spike in country music listenership.

=== As WNRQ ===
On August 29, 1995, at 4 pm, after stunting for a few days with snippets of songs from random genres, as well as redirecting listeners to WDSY, 104.7 flipped to alternative rock, branded as The Revolution 104.7, WNRQ, after modern rock had proven to be the mainstream following its success in other markets. The first song on "The Revolution" was "Send Me on My Way" by Pittsburgh band Rusted Root. WNRQ was Pittsburgh's second FM alternative station, after WXXP's run from 1985 to 1988. The format would only last just shy of one year, due to the station being sold to Secret Communications, then-owner of WXDX, and who wanted to eliminate the overlap between the two stations.

=== As WJJJ ===
On June 1, 1996, after playing "Killing in the Name" by Rage Against the Machine, 104.7 flipped again, this time to smooth jazz, branding as Smooth Jazz 104.7 (with the WJJJ call letters instituted on June 28, 1996). The WJJJ call sign was an obvious nod to WJJZ (106.1 FM) in Philadelphia.

At 2 pm on May 24, 1999, the station flipped to urban oldies, branded as 104.7 The Beat. "Pittsburgh's Jammin' Oldies" was widely popular, though management skewed the format towards more current material to attract a broad audience; this didn't help, as the station's ratings began to sink. The station changed its slogan to "Pittsburgh's Jammin' Hits" in a half-hearted attempt to attract new listeners, and modified its format towards Urban AC in 2003 to compete against WAMO.

=== As WPGB ===
On January 2, 2004, the station flipped to a Talk format, branded as NewsTalk 104.7. The current WPGB call letters took effect that day.

During its ten years as a talk station, for most of that time The War Room with Quinn and Rose, a show hosted by longtime Pittsburgh disc jockey Jim Quinn, was flagshipped at WPGB. Quinn was dismissed in a contract dispute in November 2013.

When WPGB was a talk station, its programming was fairly standard for a Clear Channel station of its type, a regional morning show (itself simulcast on several stations throughout northern Appalachia and New England), followed by Glenn Beck, Rush Limbaugh and Sean Hannity, with Dave Ramsey and Andy Dean in the evening hours. From 6-8 pm, Greg Henson hosted a sports talk show featuring interviews other local sports talk show hosts conducted earlier in the day on sister stations. Weekday newscasts were supplied by Cleveland station WTAM and Fox News Radio.

- Wall Street Journal in the Morning
- The Glenn Beck Program
- Rush Limbaugh
- The Sean Hannity Show
- Coast to Coast AM with George Noory

In addition, Glen Meakem hosted a program from 8-9:30 am on Saturday and Sunday mornings.

=== Today ===
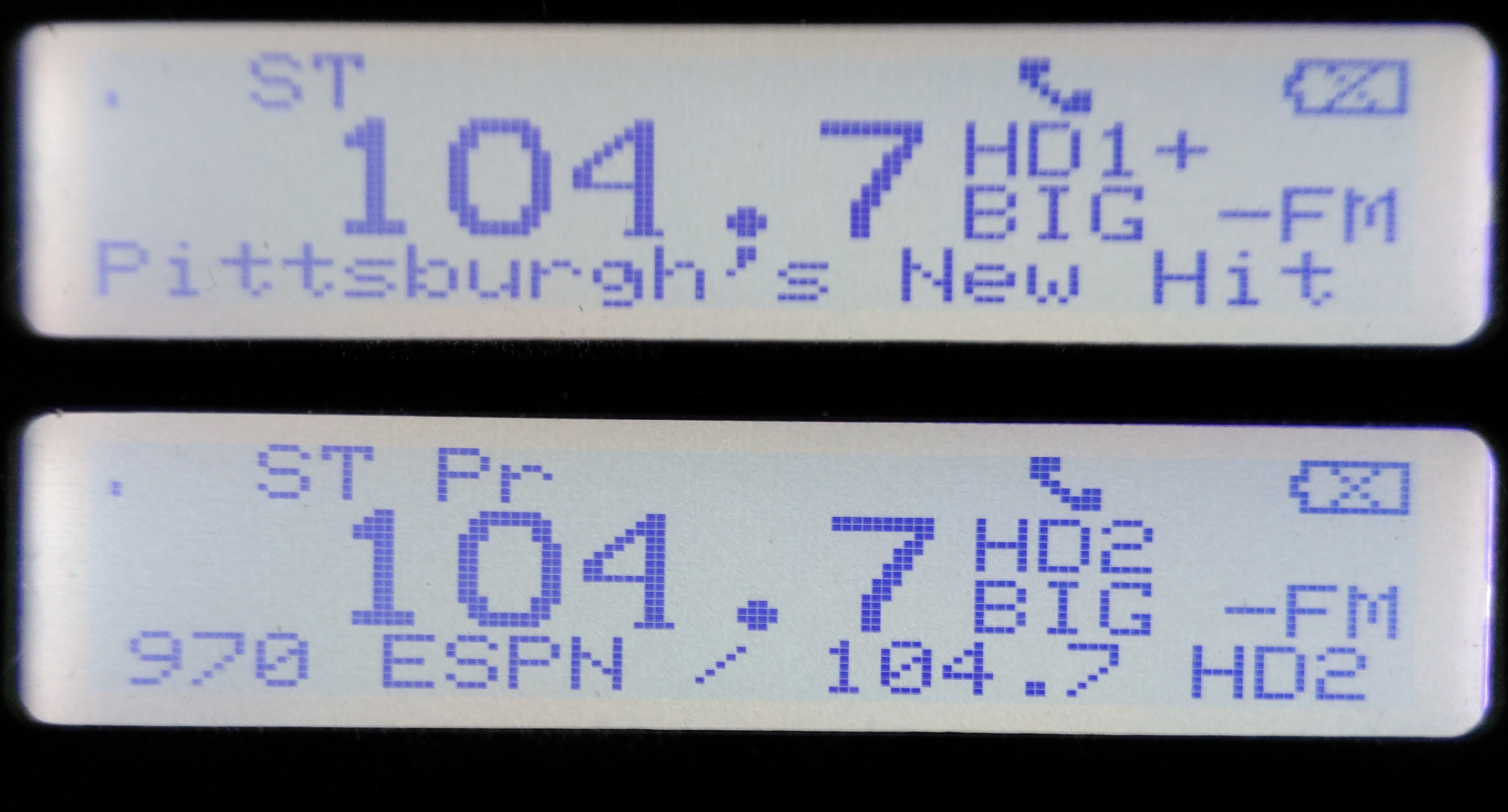
WPGB's HD Radio Channels on a SPARC Radio with PSD.

In July 2014, rumors surfaced that 104.7 would soon flip back to country, possibly named 104.7 The Bull to match similar stations in Boston, Atlanta, St. Louis, Lexington, Portland, and Houston with the format and branding, following a decline of ratings from the previous November (when Quinn and Rose were still with the station), from a 4.1 rating to a 2.5 in the June 2014 Nielsen ratings.

On August 7, 2014, Clear Channel sold off the entire intellectual property unit of WPGB's talk format to Frank Iorio, who was taking over operations of WJAS. WJAS dropped their longtime adult standards format at noon that day and began a three-hour simulcast of WPGB (the duration of The Rush Limbaugh Show). Both stations replaced all local commercial breaks with sweepers prompting listeners to move to WJAS, interspersed with a heart monitor sound effect. At 3 pm, WPGB abruptly cut away from the top-of-the-hour newscast (fed from the Total Traffic Network facilities in Cleveland) and, after playing a few song snippets poking fun at the format change - notably "No More Words" by Berlin - debuted a country music format as Big 104.7. The first song on "Big" was "This Is How We Roll" by Florida Georgia Line. The new station launched with 10,000 songs in a row, and compete with WDSY-FM and WOGI for Steel City country listeners.

The station's current weekday on-air lineup is heavily syndicated. As of June 2026, the station has moved from locally-originating programming to iHeart’s “Custom” feed, which features centrally-programmed music and national voice trackers. Afternoon host Kasper and weekend host David Edgar remain as the sole local voices on the station. Former local air staff include JD Greene, Katie O, Carson, and Travis.

== WPGB-HD2 ==
On April 25, 2006, Clear Channel announced that WPGB's HD2 subchannel will carry a smooth jazz music format, which was a previous station format under the call letters WJJJ. WPGB-HD2 currently airs a simulcast of sports-formatted WBGG.

== Sports ==
On September 12, 2006, Clear Channel and the Pittsburgh Pirates announced a five-year agreement in which WPGB would become the "new radio broadcast and strategic promotional partner of the Pirates beginning with the 2007 (Major League Baseball) season." WPGB was the Pirates' flagship radio station, having replaced KDKA, which broadcast the first Major League Baseball game on radio (between the Pittsburgh Pirates and the Philadelphia Phillies) in 1921, and served as the Pirates' flagship station for 52 seasons (1955–2006). On July 6, 2010, the station was announced as the new home for the Duquesne Dukes men's basketball team.

The station also lost its partnership with the Pittsburgh Pirates after the 2011 season to KDKA-FM.
