= Mark Madden =

Radio sports talk show host, professional wrestling commentator

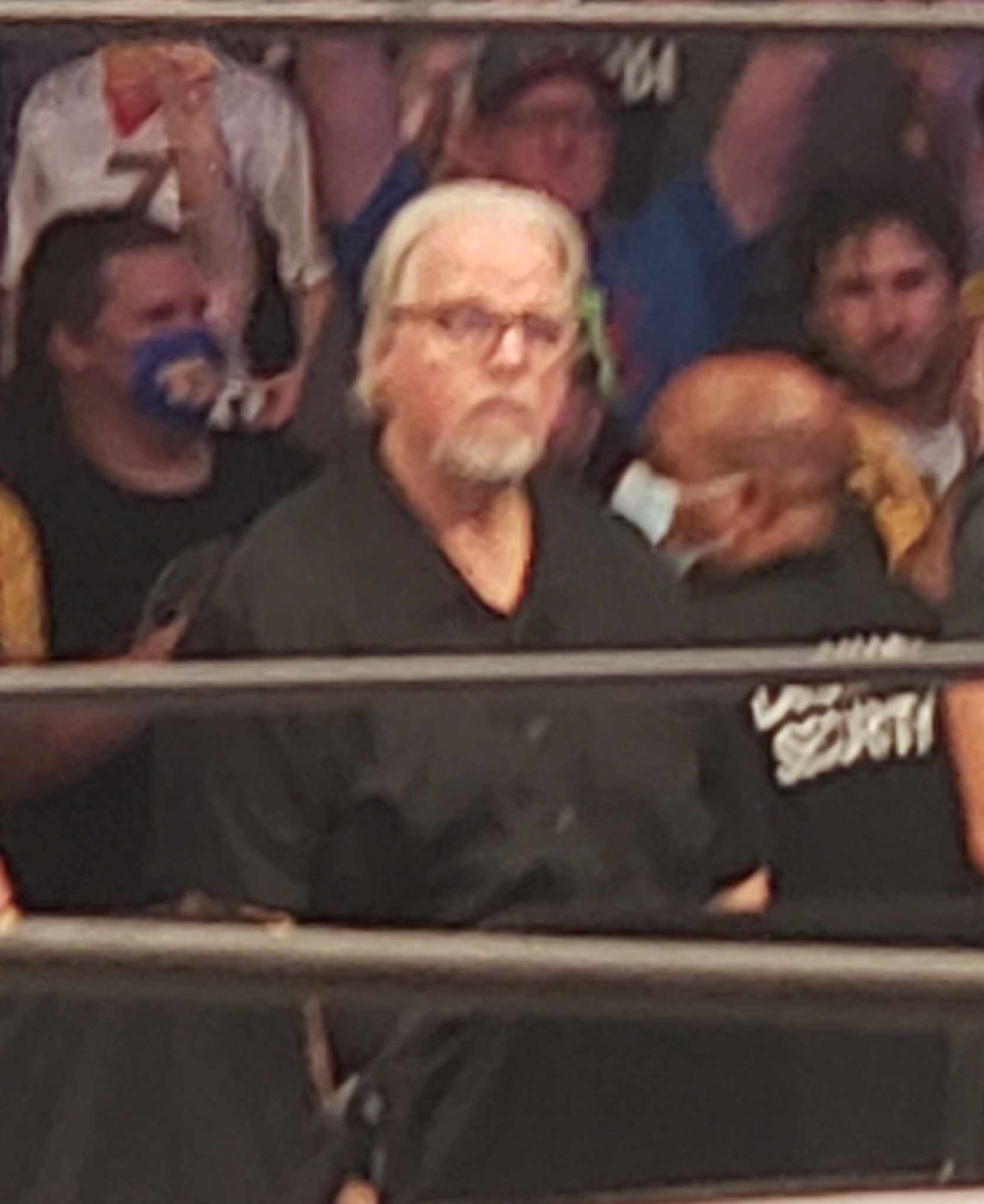
- Madden attending AEW Dynamite in 2021
- Born: Mark Madden; December 29, 1960 (age 65); Pittsburgh, Pennsylvania, U.S.
- Other name: Greg Madden
- Education: Duquesne University
- Occupation: Sportscaster
- Years active: 1992–present
- Website: iHeartMedia profile

Mark Madden (born December 29, 1960) is an American sports talk show host in Pittsburgh. He is best known for his work as a professional wrestling color commentator for World Championship Wrestling (WCW). Madden hosts a weekday afternoon show from 3-6 PM on local radio station, 105.9 The X, and serves as a part-time sports columnist for TribLive.

== Career ==
=== Professional wrestling ===
==== World Championship Wrestling (1992–2001) ====
Madden wrote for Pro Wrestling Torch from 1992 to 1994. His most notable moment during this time came during an interview with baseball legend Hank Aaron, who was working for the Atlanta Braves at the time and was informed by Madden of the employment of "Cowboy" Bill Watts by World Championship Wrestling, then a sister company to the Braves via their common ownership by Turner Broadcasting System. Madden had informed Aaron about racist comments Watts had made to the wrestling media before being hired by WCW as head booker and president, leading to Aaron to push for Watts' removal.

The story gave Madden national attention, and he was eventually hired by WCW to work as a TV color commentator and magazine writer by Watts' replacement as WCW president, Eric Bischoff. Much of his time during WCW's peak in the Monday Night War was behind the scenes, though he ran the WCW Hotline, a 900 number service with "insider tips" alongside Gene Okerlund. He also befriended his childhood idol, Ric Flair, whom Madden had watched as a child on Mid-Atlantic Championship Wrestling via his UHF antenna on WJNL-TV in Johnstown, Pennsylvania, (now Jeannette-licensed WPKD-TV); the two remained close friends for decades.

Starting in early 2000, he began appearing on WCW television on a regular basis, replacing Bobby Heenan (in both a cost-cutting move also due to Heenan's declining health) on the commentary booth on WCW Monday Nitro & WCW Thunder, as well as the pay-per-view events. Primarily a heel during this time, Madden's wrestling persona would be similar to his radio talk show persona in Pittsburgh. He did see some in-ring action against Okerlund (both losses), as well as being unprovokingly attacked by Tank Abbott who started randomly attacking people (ironically at Madden's encouragement) until Bill Goldberg answered a challenge that never was resolved on WCW television.

Often considered one of the worst announcers in wrestling history. Madden began wearing Hawaiian shirts at the insistence of Vince Russo. Madden, who didn't like wearing a shirt and tie, liked it so much that he continues to wear them today on his radio show and as a panelist on a Sunday night sports show on WPXI until he was fired from the show in 2021.

Shortly before Vince McMahon purchased WCW in March 2001, Madden was fired in December 2000 for making disparaging remarks about the company, lobbying for the return of the fired Scott Hall, and disclosing information about the sale of WCW.

==== Post-WCW (2001–present) ====
Madden spent several years as a regular columnist for Wade Keller's Pro Wrestling Torch Newsletter.

Within the wrestling world, Madden was known for his legitimate running feud with Diamond Dallas Page. Madden has often blamed Page for his firing from WCW (though he was happy to go at the time) and has often referred to him as "DDMe" on his online articles and radio shows. While Page has offered to appear on Madden's show, Madden declines each time. While Madden gave Page credit for turning around the lives of Jake Roberts and Scott Hall, he cited Page's use of TV cameras to film the progress of their rehabilitation in Page's home, which he felt was unnecessary and more or less was used to fuel Page's ego. By 2020, however, Madden and Page had made up at a Starrcast event, at the encouragement of Sean Waltman. Madden is also known for his long-running feud with Jim Cornette.

After weeks of teasing it, in 2021, Madden began co-hosting The Best Wrestling Show. with former WWE VP of Global Television Production Mike Mansury, a wrestling podcast produced by Pat McAfee. The podcast was available for free on YouTube. The podcast went on hiatus on May 13, 2021, after a little over two months due to Masury taking another job and him & Madden unable to work out logistics. Madden has since been shadow banned from the Pat McAfee show.

On August 11, 2021, Madden was booed while in attendance at the All Elite Wrestling event at the Petersen Events Center for AEW Dynamite and AEW Dark: Elevation, sitting ringside. During the Dark: Elevation taping, he was acknowledged on-air by former WCW colleagues Tony Schiavone & Paul Wight and guest commentator Eddie Kingston during the Sammy Guevara–Serpentico match when Guevara threw Serpentico's tag team partner Luther into the barricade in front of Madden.

On November 17, 2021, Madden returned to wrestling podcasting when he became the host of Ric Flair's Wooooo Nation Uncensored. The podcast came to an abrupt end on March 27, 2022, when Madden announced his resignation and thanked Flair for the opportunity, which was followed by Flair admitting that Madden was fired and replaced by Flair's son-in-law Conrad Thompson. It eventually led to a Twitter exchange that saw the two end their friendship after 35 years.

=== Local sports journalism ===
A 1982 graduate of Duquesne University, and member of Tau Kappa Epsilon International Fraternity, Madden has also worked within mainstream sports journalism, including fifteen years at the Pittsburgh Post-Gazette, where he primarily covered high schools for the paper's suburban sections, as well as stints at the now-defunct Penguins Report and the weekly Pittsburgh City Paper. He subsequently appeared as a featured guest on Action Sports Sunday on WTAE-TV, a half-hour sports discussion show. The Post-Gazette reported on November 17, 2006, that WTAE-TV dropped Mark Madden as a freelance sports commentator on its Sunday night sports show. In 2015, Madden joined WPNT for a nightly televised sports talk show, an edited replay of his radio show, which was removed from WPNT's schedule in 2016. Madden often nicknames himself the "Super Genius" on his programs and social media due to having an IQ score of 166, of which he was tested on in the fourth grade.

Madden wrote a weekly column called "Monday Madden" for the Beaver County Times, a Pittsburgh-area newspaper, starting in May 2007; the column continued for over a decade until his departure to work for TribLive in 2018.

In May 2004 Madden was very critical of Lisa Guerrero then of Monday Night Football calling her "biggest liability ever" In February, 2021 Guerrero spoke to the NY Post and talked about how much that article bothered her so much and she thought about killing herself.

In May 2008, Madden was fired from his talk show on Pittsburgh's 1250 ESPN radio station for the following comment: "I'm very disappointed to hear that Senator Ted Kennedy of Massachusetts is near death because of a brain tumor. I always hoped Senator Kennedy would live long enough to be assassinated."

In December 2011 Madden came under fire for tweeting a misogynist tweet. "Look, ur a girl, so... u know nothing & ur opinion is useless. Get in the kitchen, have a kid, dance 'round a pole, something".

Another area of sports in which Madden is heavily involved is the game of street hockey. Madden runs Street Hockey USA, and is also involved in the American Street Hockey Institute, a non-profit organization dedicated to growing the game of street/dek/ball hockey in America. He has coached numerous National Champion teams over the years (most notably his Pittsburgh Wizards team), as well as coaching the United States Junior team to a gold medal in the 2006 World Junior Championship in Germany.

Although Sara Ganim broke the story on March 31, 2011, on April 3, 2011, his Beaver County Times column addressed a then-current grand jury investigation into alleged child sexual abuse by former Penn State football assistant coach Jerry Sandusky, suggesting the possibility of a Penn State cover-up. After Sandusky was indicted on over 40 felony charges, Madden appeared on The Dennis and Callahan Show, a Boston sports talk radio program, on November 10. During his appearance, he reported a rumor being investigated by two prominent columnists that Sandusky and his Second Mile children's charity may have been "pimping out young boys to rich donors."

==== Views on Pittsburgh sports teams ====
Madden's views on Pittsburgh's three major professional sports teams are mixed. While Madden usually defends the Penguins, he has mixed views about the Pittsburgh Steelers and is harshly critical of the Pittsburgh Pirates.

With the Steelers Madden has often praised the Rooney family for going all-out to win but questions the team's decisions regarding off-field actions of their players, and was particularly critical of Antonio Brown. Madden has also been critical of the team's non-confrontational tactics regarding team legends near the end of their careers dating back to Franco Harris, though he did defend the team regarding James Harrison.

Although Madden was a big source of the Kordell Stewart rumors having substance, often making jokes about Stewart's sexuality on the air. John Steigerwald, and Madden who by then changed his tune, were one of the few local sports journalists to defend former Steelers quarterback Kordell Stewart, feeling Stewart was being unfairly judged due to being African American and was also critical of the Steelers decision to have Stewart downplay rumors of his homosexuality.

With regards to the Pirates, Madden is highly critical of team owner Bob Nutting placing profits ahead of putting a competitive product on the field and is critical of Pirates fans who continuously support the team, feeling that the team will not be consistently a contender unless Nutting sells the team. As such, Madden is one of the only local sportscasters who will not cover the Pirates in Pittsburgh. Madden, did, however, defend the Pirates decision to have Todd Frazier designated for assignment after batting .086 in 35 plate appearances, leading to a Twitter feud between the two and many Pittsburghers laughing at Madden after Frazier was fat shaming Madden during the feud.

== Personal life ==
Madden was raised as an only child by a single mother in Reserve Township. He lived at home with her until he was 40 years old, having never met his father nor showing any interest in tracking him down. His mother, a speech teacher at North Hills High School with whom Madden was very close, died in 2006.

Madden is a fan of Liverpool F.C. and often watches their games during his program, giving a commentary. He is also a fan of classic rock and heavy metal music. His favorite band is UFO, and plays their song "Too Hot to Handle" from their album Lights Out at the beginning of his show, while playing Liverpool's chant at the end of the Pink Floyd song "Fearless" from their album Meddle to close out his show.

More local to Pittsburgh, Madden is also a fan of the Pittsburgh Penguins, having attended at least one game since their inaugural season, and idolizes Penguins center Mario Lemieux. Late in Lemieux's career, Madden made note of his "repeatedly trying to score directly off faceoffs." He once bet Lemieux $66 that he could not score directly off a draw. Lemieux thought the $66 bet was "cheap", and challenged Madden to a $6,600 bet. Madden accepted, and agreed that all the money would go to the Mario Lemieux Foundation. Lemieux had attempted the shot several times, with the closest effort being a post shot against the Calgary Flames on December 21, 2002. On December 23, 2002, Lemieux lined up against Buffalo Sabres faceoff specialist Chris Gratton. With the Penguins tied 2-2 and Gratton being a left-handed draw, Lemieux used the opportunity to take the shot on net. Lemieux shot the puck as it was dropped, going between Gratton's legs, off defenseman Alexei Zhitnik's skate, and eventually past goaltender Mika Noronen. Lemieux immediately looked to the pressbox, where he knew Madden was watching the game, and raised his arms. Lemieux admitted to trying the shot several times and that it was a tough shot to do without a good bounce. After the goal, Madden said he was planning a telethon to help him raise the $6,600 promised to the Mario Lemieux Foundation.

Madden was hospitalized on January 29, 2006, after suffering a heart attack during a dek-hockey tournament in Reading, Pennsylvania. Madden drove himself to a local hospital after feeling nauseated, and had the heart procedure done a day after checking in. He resumed his radio show three days later, although in a different time slot.

In October & November 2021, what was originally planned as a quick vacation to Las Vegas turned into 2 1/2 weeks off after Madden tested positive for COVID-19. Madden, who had been fully vaccinated and an advocate for receiving the COVID-19 vaccine, said that being vaccinated "saved his life".

In August 2024 Madden signed a three year contract extension.after hinting on Twitter he could be nearing his final week. Madden said he would probably quit after the Penguins 2025-2026 season. Madden didn't quit after the 2025-2026 season and continues to do the show. However changes were made to the show. First Tom Opferman would join for the first hour, and the show would move from 3-6 to 2-6 during Steelers and Penguins season. The change in time is believed to be to try to compete with The PM Team w/Poni and Mueller. Hosts Andrew Fillipponi and Chris Mueller who have won the Barrett Sports Media number one mid-market PM drives sports talk show 4 years in a row.
