= WXDX-FM =

- Pittsburgh, Pennsylvania; United States
- Broadcast area: Greater Pittsburgh
- Frequency: 105.9 MHz (HD Radio)
- Branding: 105.9 The X

Programming
- Format: Modern rock
- Affiliations: Compass Media Networks; Premiere Networks; Penguins Radio Network

Ownership
- Owner: iHeartMedia, Inc.; (iHM Licenses, LLC)
- Sister stations: WBGG; WDVE; WKST-FM; WPGB; WWSW-FM

History
- First air date: January 1, 1961
- Former call signs: WAZZ (1961–1962); WAMO-FM (1962–1996)

Technical information
- Licensing authority: FCC
- Facility ID: 60153
- Class: B
- ERP: 15,500 watts
- HAAT: 272 meters (892 ft)
- Transmitter coordinates: 40°29′38.2″N 80°1′8.2″W

Links
- Public license information: Public file; LMS
- Webcast: Listen live (via iHeartRadio)
- Website: 1059thex.iheart.com

WXDX-FM (105.9 MHz "105.9 The X") is a commercial radio station located in Pittsburgh, Pennsylvania. It airs a modern rock radio format and is owned by iHeartMedia. The station's studios and offices are located on Abele Road in Bridgeville next to I-79. WXDX is the flagship radio station of the Pittsburgh Penguins hockey team.

WXDX-FM has an effective radiated power (ERP) of 15,500 watts. Its transmitter is located off Swanson Street in Pittsburgh's North Side, on a tower shared with KDKA-TV and other FM stations. WXDX-FM broadcasts using HD Radio technology.

== History ==
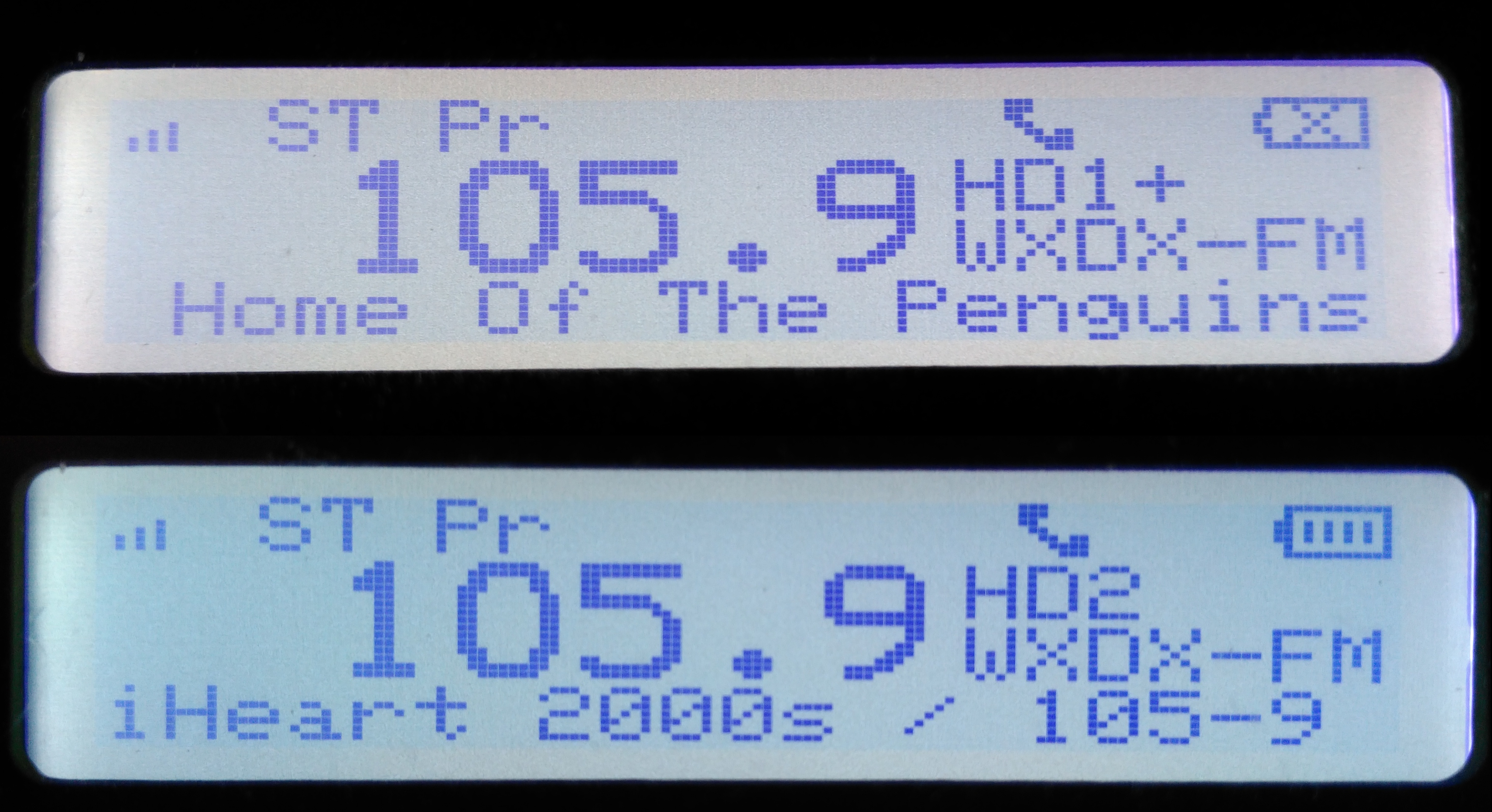
WXDX's HD Radio Channels on a SPARC Radio with PSD.

On January 1, 1961, the station signed on as WAZZ, with an all-jazz format. It changed its call sign to WAMO-FM on July 30, 1962. At first, its effective radiated power was 4,500 watts. In 1962, it upgraded to 72,000 watts it began simulcasting its AM sister station, WAMO (now WAOB). WAMO-AM-FM served the Pittsburgh African-American community with R&B and soul music, as well as Black talk and news programming on weekdays, and religious shows on Sundays.

In the later 1960s, the FM station began separate programming, specializing in Urban contemporary music, with WAMO-AM-FM sometimes simulcasting on weekends. Over the years, the station was branded as Hot 106 WAMO.

It also had various formats during its later years, which also included Disco music and Rhythmic contemporary or "CHUrban".

On April 10, 1996, at 3 pm, WAMO-FM swapped frequencies with WXDX-FM, with the urban format moving to 106.7 FM, while WXDX's alternative rock format moved to the more powerful 105.9 FM frequency.

WXDX-FM was one of six stations owned by Clear Channel Communications (now iHeartMedia) that dropped The Howard Stern Show in February 2004 (however, Stern would show up on WRKZ later that year). Howard began airing on WXDX in November 1995 (when it was still on 106.7 FM).

Since 2008, WXDX-FM has served as the home for sports talk host Mark Madden.

== WXDX-FM HD2 ==
WXDX broadcasts using HD Radio technology. It had programming on its HD2 digital subchannel beginning in 2006, launching a format focusing on Adult album alternative (Triple A) music.

In May 2009, as part of its renewal of Pittsburgh Penguins radio rights, WXDX and the Penguins announced that the HD2 subchannel would become a 24-hour channel devoted to Penguins coverage, billed as "Pittsburgh Penguins Radio." It launched on October 1, 2009, with local and nationally-originated Penguins and hockey coverage (including "NHL Live" and league commissioner Gary Bettman's weekly "NHL Hour"), rebroadcasts of classic Penguins games, and game broadcasts of the team's top farm club in Wilkes-Barre/Scranton. The move made the Penguins the second North American professional sports team with their own terrestrial radio channel (after the NFL's Dallas Cowboys and their HD2 relationship with KRLD-FM).

In the fall of 2015, WXDX-FM-HD2 dropped Penguins Radio 24/7 with music WXDX normally plays on their station (but still simulcast Penguins games) until late March 2016 when iHeart2000s began airing. That programming later moved over by WKST-FM-HD2, and was replaced with Pride Radio, an LGBTQ service offered by iHeartRadio.

As of early 2020, WXDX is no longer broadcasting an HD2 subchannel.
