= Bob Errey =

Canadian ice hockey player (born 1964)

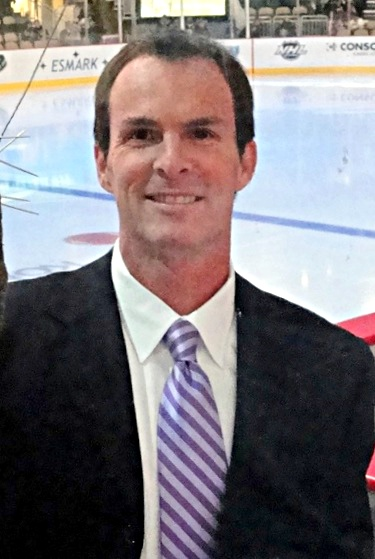
- Errey in 2012
- Born: September 21, 1964 (age 62) Montreal, Quebec, Canada
- Height: 5 ft 10 in (178 cm)
- Weight: 180 lb (82 kg; 12 st 12 lb)
- Position: Left wing
- Shot: Left
- Played for: Pittsburgh Penguins; Buffalo Sabres; San Jose Sharks; Detroit Red Wings; Dallas Stars; New York Rangers
- National team: Canada
- NHL draft: 15th overall, 1983; Pittsburgh Penguins
- Playing career: 1983–1999
Medal record
Men's ice hockey
Representing Canada
World Championship
Gold medal – first place	1997 Canada	Ice hockey

Robert Errey (born September 21, 1964) is a Canadian former professional ice hockey left wing and former sportscaster for the Pittsburgh Penguins of the National Hockey League (NHL). He was drafted 15th overall by Pittsburgh in the 1983 NHL entry draft and played 895 NHL games over the course of his career.

== Playing career ==
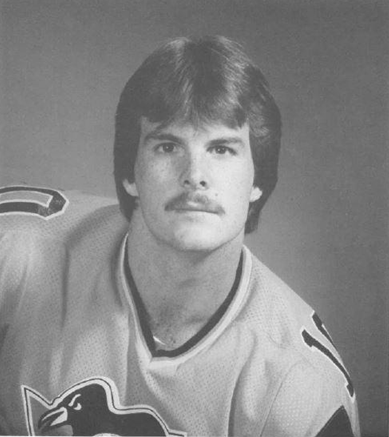
1983 card of Errey for Pittsburgh Penguins

Errey was born in Montreal, Quebec. As a youth, he played in the 1977 Quebec International Pee-Wee Hockey Tournament with a minor ice hockey team from Peterborough, Ontario.

Errey played junior ice hockey with the Peterborough Petes of the Ontario Hockey League from 1980 to 1983. During that time he teamed with Steve Yzerman to form the top line, and led the team in goals with 53 in 1983. Errey would eventually reunite with Yzerman in Detroit for one full season and two half seasons in the mid 1990s.

Errey played most notably for the Pittsburgh Penguins, but also played for the Buffalo Sabres, San Jose Sharks, Detroit Red Wings, Dallas Stars and New York Rangers. He won two Stanley Cups as a member of the Penguins in 1991 and 1992. He was also a member of Team Canada in 1997 winning a gold medal at the World Championships and appeared in the 1995 Stanley Cup Final with Detroit. With the Penguins, he originally wore jersey #10 then settled with #12. He retired in 1999 after playing the entire 1998–99 season with the Hartford Wolf Pack of the American Hockey League.

Errey served as the captain of the San Jose Sharks for the 1993–94 NHL season and part of the 1994–95 season.

== Broadcast career ==
Errey is a former TV colour analyst for the Pittsburgh Penguins broadcasts on AT&T SportsNet Pittsburgh alongside Steve Mears. He also appeared as an analyst on the NHL Network's nightly highlight show, NHL on the Fly during the 2007 Stanley Cup Playoffs. He occasionally appears on TSN as an analyst during the network's coverage of the IIHF World Hockey Championships.

== Personal life ==
Errey was born in Montreal, grew up in Peterborough, Ontario, and attended Crestwood Secondary School.

Errey and his wife Tracy have two sons, Connor and Chad.

Errey is a cousin of the Indy Champ, Tom Geoghegan of the Kinloch racing team and a third cousin to hockey legend Ted Lindsay.

== Awards ==
Stanley Cup

- Pittsburgh Penguins – 1991, 1992

== Career statistics ==
=== Regular season and playoffs ===
			Regular season					Playoffs
Season	Team	League	GP	G	A	Pts	PIM	GP	G	A	Pts	PIM
1979–80	Peterborough Oilers	MetJHL	29	13	11	24	12	—	—	—	—	—
1980–81	Peterborough Lumber Petes	MetJHL	42	28	42	70	93	—	—	—	—	—
1980–81	Peterborough Petes	OHL	6	0	0	0	0	—	—	—	—	—
1981–82	Peterborough Petes	OHL	68	29	31	60	39	9	3	1	4	9
1982–83	Peterborough Petes	OHL	67	53	47	100	74	4	1	3	4	7
1983–84	Pittsburgh Penguins	NHL	65	9	13	22	29	—	—	—	—	—
1984–85	Baltimore Skipjacks	AHL	59	17	24	41	14	8	3	4	7	11
1984–85	Pittsburgh Penguins	NHL	16	0	2	2	7	—	—	—	—	—
1985–86	Baltimore Skipjacks	AHL	18	8	7	15	28	—	—	—	—	—
1985–86	Pittsburgh Penguins	NHL	37	11	6	17	8	—	—	—	—	—
1986–87	Pittsburgh Penguins	NHL	72	16	18	34	46	—	—	—	—	—
1987–88	Pittsburgh Penguins	NHL	17	3	6	9	18	—	—	—	—	—
1988–89	Pittsburgh Penguins	NHL	76	26	32	58	124	11	1	2	3	12
1989–90	Pittsburgh Penguins	NHL	78	20	19	39	109	—	—	—	—	—
1990–91	Pittsburgh Penguins	NHL	79	20	22	42	115	24	5	2	7	29
1991–92	Pittsburgh Penguins	NHL	78	19	16	35	119	14	3	0	3	10
1992–93	Pittsburgh Penguins	NHL	54	8	6	14	76	—	—	—	—	—
1992–93	Buffalo Sabres	NHL	8	1	3	4	4	4	0	1	1	10
1993–94	San Jose Sharks	NHL	64	12	18	30	126	14	3	2	5	10
1994–95	San Jose Sharks	NHL	13	2	2	4	27	—	—	—	—	—
1994–95	Detroit Red Wings	NHL	30	6	11	17	31	18	1	5	6	30
1995–96	Detroit Red Wings	NHL	71	11	21	32	66	14	0	4	4	8
1996–97	Detroit Red Wings	NHL	36	1	2	3	27	—	—	—	—	—
1996–97	San Jose Sharks	NHL	30	3	6	9	20	—	—	—	—	—
1997–98	Dallas Stars	NHL	59	2	9	11	46	—	—	—	—	—
1997–98	New York Rangers	NHL	12	0	0	0	7	—	—	—	—	—
1998–99	Hartford Wolf Pack	AHL	69	18	27	45	59	7	0	3	3	8
NHL totals			895	170	212	382	1,005	99	13	16	29	109

=== International ===
Year	Team	Event	Result	GP	G	A	Pts	PIM
1997	Canada	WC	1st place, gold medalist(s)	11	2	1	3	6
Senior totals				11	2	1	3	6

Preceded by Rich Sutter	Pittsburgh Penguins first-round draft pick 1983	Succeeded by Mario Lemieux
Preceded by Doug Wilson	San Jose Sharks captain 1993–95	Succeeded by Jeff Odgers
