= Patti Burns =

American journalist and news anchor (1952–2001)

Patricia Jeanne Burns (January 27, 1952 – October 31, 2001) was an American journalist and television news anchor.

Burns was a familiar face to television audiences in Pittsburgh, where she worked for many years for KDKA-TV, a station for which her father, Bill Burns, was also a journalist and anchor. Father and daughter made history when on October 18, 1976, they began to anchor the news together.

== Biography ==
=== Early life ===
Patricia Jeanne Burns was born in 1952, while her father was still working for radio station KQV. She attended Mt. Lebanon High School and went on to the University of Denver.

=== Career ===
Her first job was at WFAA-TV, the ABC affiliate in Dallas, Texas. Burns, trying to make a name on her own, suffered a hostile work environment. Pittsburgh station WTAE-TV tried to woo Burns back to Pittsburgh. She nearly accepted, but when her father's station heard about the proposal, they made a counteroffer, and Burns joined KDKA on July 15, 1974.

In September 1976, the station made history when it paired father and daughter for the noon news. Initially, the move was criticized and labeled "The Patti and Daddy Show", but the concept proved popular with viewers.

Burns anchored the news for over 20 years, until her relationship with station management deteriorated over the direction of the broadcast. Her last broadcast for KDKA was January 16, 1997.

After her departure, she created Burns Communications, a video production company, and eventually contributed stories to news programs for WQED-TV, the local PBS affiliate.

She worked for a wide range of charities and causes, including Animal Friends, St. Peter's Child Development Centers, and Magee-Women's Hospital Foundation. She was chosen by Carlow University as its first Woman of Spirit and awarded honorary doctorates from Rollins College and La Roche College.

=== Death ===
Burns was diagnosed with lung cancer in early 2001. She married longtime companion Charles Cohen, a noted lawyer in Pittsburgh, shortly after her diagnosis on May 18, 2001, at the Allegheny County Courthouse. Burns died on October 31, 2001, with memorial services held on December 9, 2001.
