= Mike Lange =

American sportscaster (1948–2025)

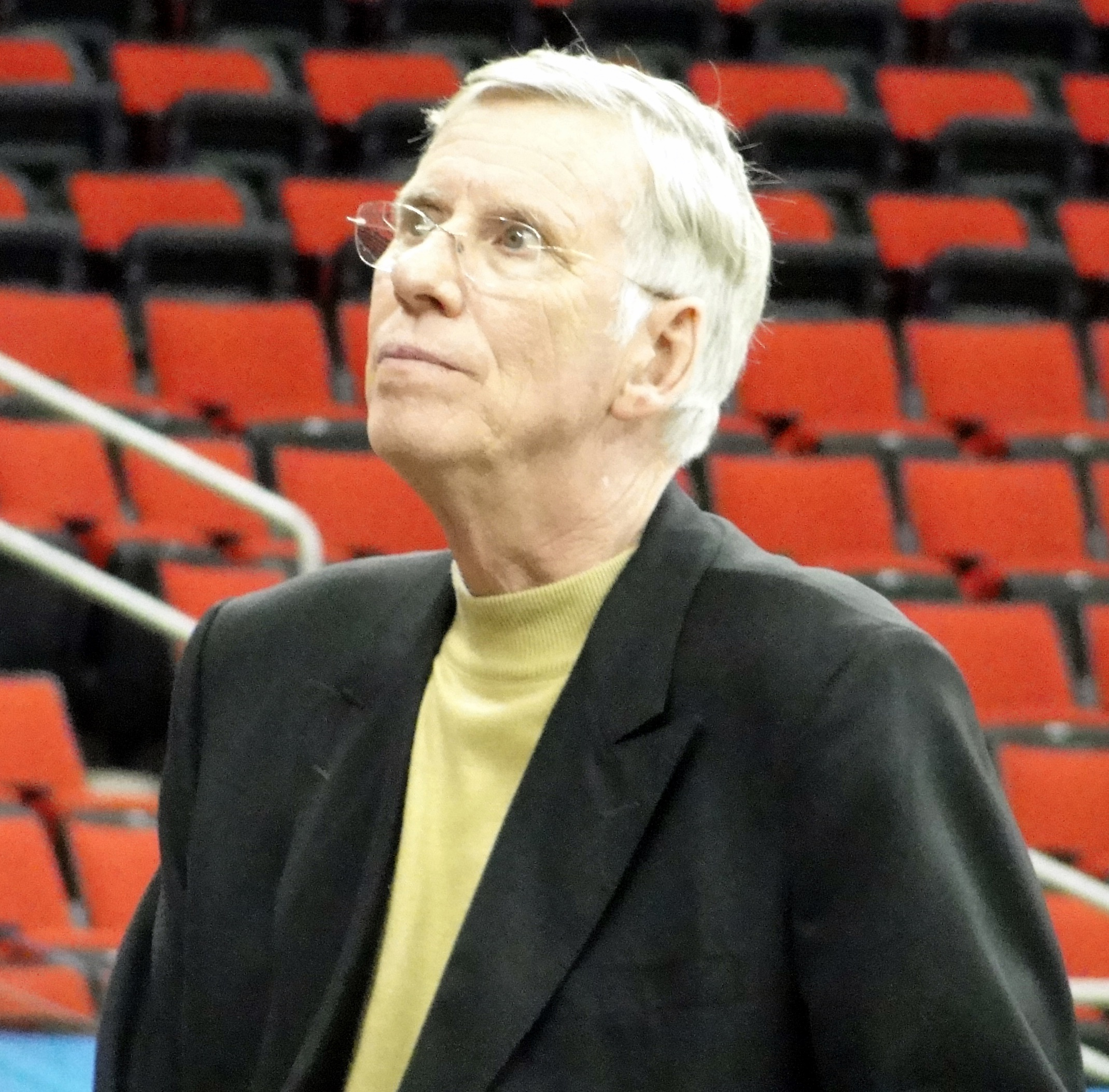
- Lange in 2011
- Born: March 3, 1948; Sacramento, California, U.S.
- Died: February 19, 2025 (aged 76); Pittsburgh, Pennsylvania, U.S.
- Education: Sacramento State University
- Sports commentary career
- Team: Pittsburgh Penguins (1974, 1976–2021)
- Genre: Play-by-play
- Sport: National Hockey League

Mike Lange (March 3, 1948 – February 19, 2025) was an American sportscaster best known for his 46-year career as a play-by-play announcer for the Pittsburgh Penguins of the National Hockey League (NHL). Lange served as the team's play-by-play announcer in 1974 and again from 1976 to 2021. In 2001, he received the Foster Hewitt Memorial Award for his outstanding work as an NHL broadcaster.

== Career ==
In 1969, while attending Sacramento State University, Lange was encouraged by his friend to attend a hockey game. At the time, Lange had never attended a hockey game before.

From there, Lange worked in the penalty box at local arenas, coordinating the penalty time with the public address (PA) announcer. He eventually replaced the PA announcer after he asked for a raise and his play-by-play was broadcast over the college radio station.

Lange joined the Pittsburgh Penguins as a radio announcer in 1974 after spending time as a commentator for the San Diego Gulls and Phoenix Roadrunners of the Western Hockey League. He left the Penguins after just one season, because the team was in bankruptcy and he had no guarantee of a job. Lange called Washington Diplomats soccer games, then returned to the Penguins for the 1976–77 season, where he became the central figure of the team's broadcast presence.

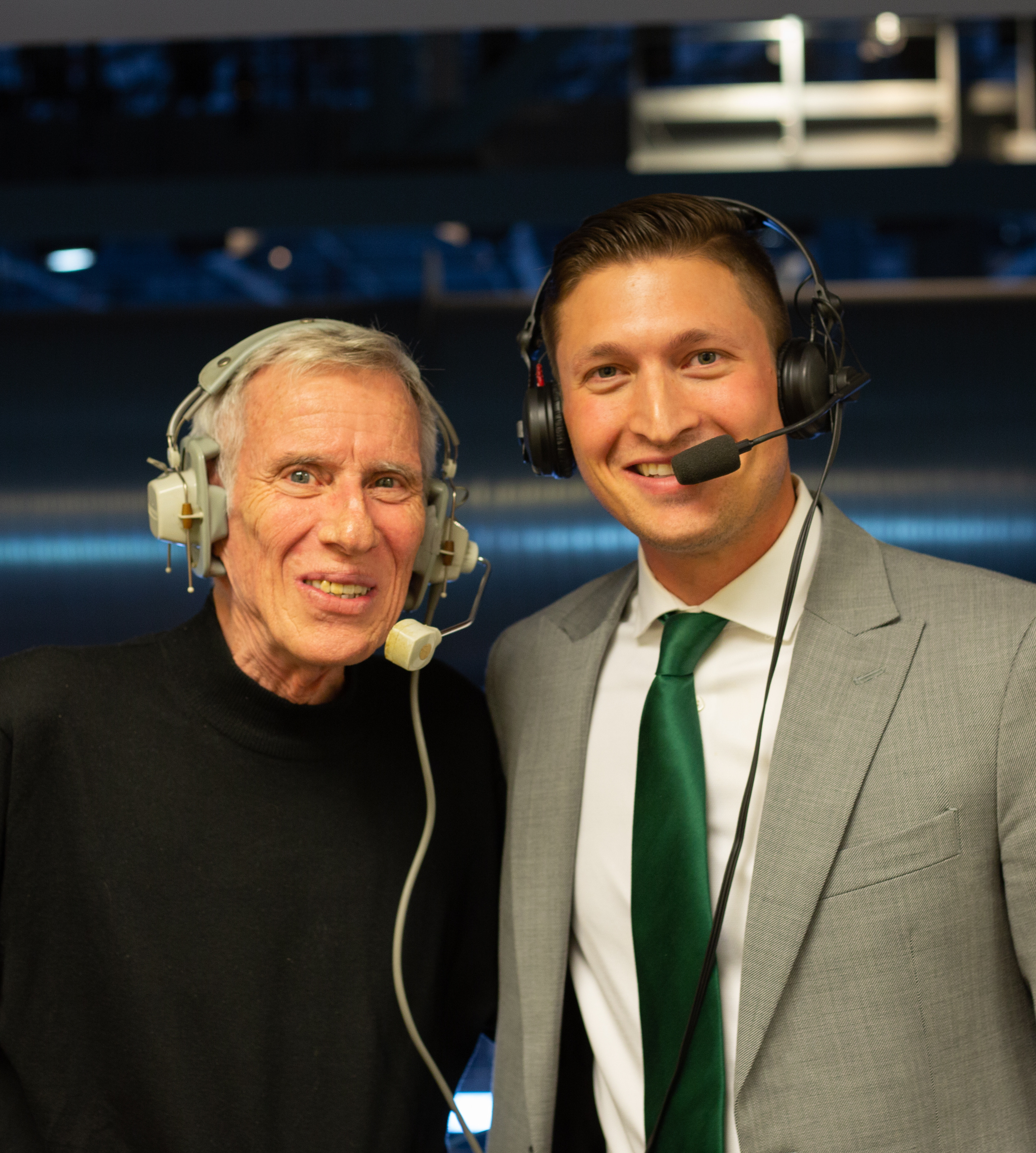
Lange with Josh Getzoff in 2018

From 1976 until 2006, Lange served as the lead play-by-play announcer for the Penguins' radio and television network, never missing a broadcast. In 2001, Lange was the recipient of the Foster Hewitt Memorial Award for his outstanding work as an NHL broadcaster. On June 29, 2006, citing a desire to go in a new direction, Fox Sports Pittsburgh (now SportsNet Pittsburgh) did not exercise the option year on Lange's contract. He was replaced by his longtime radio partner and color commentator, Paul Steigerwald, in a move that was extremely unpopular with fans. On taking Lange's spot Steigerwald said, "I'm not going to try to replace him. I think he's irreplaceable." On August 4, 2006, Lange signed a contract to work on Penguins' radio broadcasts.

From 1985 to 1986, he also broadcast several NHL games for ESPN that did not involve the Pittsburgh Penguins. In 1986 and 1987, he also called Pittsburgh Pirates baseball games on cable television.

Lange and then-colleague Steigerwald appeared together as themselves in the 1995 movie Sudden Death, starring Jean-Claude Van Damme. In the film, Lange used many of his trademark expressions in his play-by-play commentary.

On October 8, 2019, prior to a game against the Winnipeg Jets, Lange was presented with an autographed personalized jersey to commemorate his 45th year.

On August 9, 2021, the Pittsburgh Penguins announced that Lange would be retiring after a 46-year career with the Penguins.

== Personal life and death ==
Lange was born in Sacramento, California, on March 3, 1948.

Lange had two sons, Tanner and Ian.

He died in his home in Pittsburgh, on February 19, 2025, at the age of 76.

== See also ==
- List of Pittsburgh Penguins broadcasters

Preceded by Bob Miller	Foster Hewitt Memorial Award; 2001	Succeeded by Gilles Tremblay
Preceded by Joe Starkey; Gary Morrell; Paul Steigerwald	Pittsburgh Penguins radio play-by-play announcer 1974–1975; 1976–1993; 2006–2021	Succeeded by Gary Morrell; Doug McLeod; Josh Getzoff
Preceded by Jim Forney	Pittsburgh Penguins television play-by-play announcer 1979–2006	Succeeded by Paul Steigerwald
