= Phil Bourque =

American ice hockey player (born 1962)

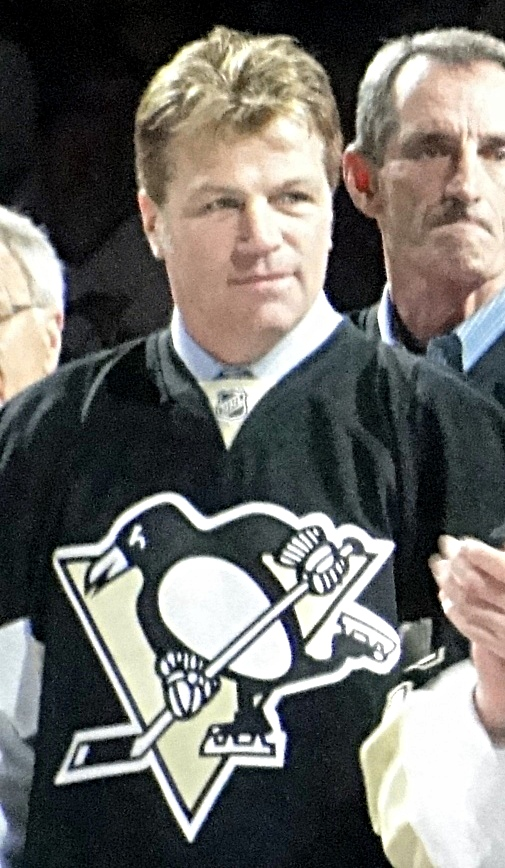
- Born: June 8, 1962 (age 64) Chelmsford, Massachusetts, U.S.
- Height: 6 ft 1 in (185 cm)
- Weight: 196 lb (89 kg; 14 st 0 lb)
- Position: Left wing/defense
- Shot: Left
- Played for: Pittsburgh Penguins; New York Rangers; Ottawa Senators; Rosenheim Star Bulls
- National team: United States
- NHL draft: Undrafted
- Playing career: 1982–2000

Phillipe Richard Bourque (born June 8, 1962) is an American former professional ice hockey player. He was never selected in the NHL entry draft; instead, he was signed as a free agent by the Pittsburgh Penguins on October 4, 1982. He is of no relation to former Bruins and Avalanche defenseman Ray Bourque.

== Playing career ==
Bourque joined the Penguins organization after playing two seasons in the Ontario Hockey League with the Kingston Canadians. He joined the Penguins' American Hockey League affiliate, the Baltimore Skipjacks for the 1982–83 season, and made his NHL debut with Pittsburgh in 1983–84, playing in five games.

Bourque would not become a mainstay on the Penguins roster until the 1988–89 season, during which he played in all 80 of the team's games. He would be a member of the Penguins teams which won the Stanley Cup in the 1990–91 and 1991–92 seasons. Mike "Doc" Emrick would recount later that Bourque, after winning the 1991-1992 Stanley Cup, had put his name inside the Cup with the many jewelers who had worked on the cup in the past. He had worked on the cup in his garage using a screwdriver to repair a loose screw at the top of the trophy. He would leave the Penguins after the 1992 Cup victory, and play sparingly with the New York Rangers and Ottawa Senators. Just prior to the 1994–95 NHL lockout, Bourque was nearly killed when he took a 40-foot fall down a cliff near Arizona's Lake Powell. He suffered three broken vertebrae in his neck, a broken skull, a shattered sinus cavity, a broken cheekbone and a broken nose in the incident.

Bourque left the NHL after the 1995–96 season. He played with the IHL's Chicago Wolves for one season, and then spent three seasons playing in Germany before retiring following the 1999–2000 season.

Bourque works as the color commentator alongside Josh Getzof for Penguins radio broadcasts. Bourque's final segment of the Penguins pre-game broadcasts is known as "Two Minutes with the Ol' Two-Niner." in which Bourque interviews a player, coach, or personality relevant to the upcoming game.

Bourque earned a spot in the hearts of many Penguins fans when he remarked at the victory celebration of Pittsburgh's first Stanley Cup title in 1991 by saying "What do you say we take this thing out on the river and party all summer"! He was referring to taking the Stanley Cup with him on any number of outdoor activities offered by Pittsburgh's three main rivers.

In his NHL career, Bourque appeared in 477 games. He scored 88 goals and added 111 assists. He also appeared in 56 playoff games, scoring 13 goals and recording 12 assists. He also represented the United States at the 1994 Men's World Ice Hockey Championships.

In October 2019, Bourque released his book "If These Walls Could Talk: Pittsburgh Penguins," where he shares his stories from both his playing and broadcasting careers with the Penguins organization.

== Career statistics ==
			Regular season					Playoffs
Season	Team	League	GP	G	A	Pts	PIM	GP	G	A	Pts	PIM
1980–81	Kingston Canadians	OHL	47	4	4	8	46	—	—	—	—	—
1981–82	Kingston Canadians	OHL	67	11	40	51	111	4	0	0	0	0
1982–83	Baltimore Skipjacks	AHL	65	1	15	16	93	—	—	—	—	—
1983–84	Baltimore Skipjacks	AHL	58	5	17	22	96	—	—	—	—	—
1983–84	Pittsburgh Penguins	NHL	5	0	1	1	12	—	—	—	—	—
1984–85	Baltimore Skipjacks	AHL	79	6	15	21	164	13	2	5	7	23
1985–86	Baltimore Skipjacks	AHL	74	8	18	26	226	—	—	—	—	—
1985–86	Pittsburgh Penguins	NHL	4	0	0	0	2	—	—	—	—	—
1986–87	Baltimore Skipjacks	AHL	49	15	16	31	183	—	—	—	—	—
1986–87	Pittsburgh Penguins	NHL	22	2	3	5	32	—	—	—	—	—
1987–88	Pittsburgh Penguins	NHL	21	4	12	16	20	—	—	—	—	—
1987–88	Muskegon Lumberjacks	IHL	52	16	36	52	66	6	1	2	3	16
1988–89	Pittsburgh Penguins	NHL	80	17	26	43	97	11	4	1	5	66
1989–90	Pittsburgh Penguins	NHL	76	22	17	39	108	—	—	—	—	—
1990–91	Pittsburgh Penguins	NHL	78	20	14	34	106	24	6	7	13	16
1991–92	Pittsburgh Penguins	NHL	58	10	16	26	58	21	3	4	7	25
1992–93	New York Rangers	NHL	55	6	14	20	39	—	—	—	—	—
1993–94	New York Rangers	NHL	16	0	1	1	8	—	—	—	—	—
1993–94	Ottawa Senators	NHL	11	2	3	5	0	—	—	—	—	—
1994–95	Ottawa Senators	NHL	38	4	3	7	20	—	—	—	—	—
1995–96	Ottawa Senators	NHL	13	1	1	2	14	—	—	—	—	—
1995–96	Detroit Vipers	IHL	36	4	13	17	70	10	1	3	4	10
1996–97	Chicago Wolves	IHL	77	7	14	21	50	4	0	2	2	2
1997–98	Rosenheim Star Bulls	DEL	40	4	7	11	60	—	—	—	—	—
1998–99	Hamburg Crocodiles	2.GBun	35	8	20	28	98	—	—	—	—	—
1999–00	Hamburg Crocodiles	2.GBun	36	1	7	8	57	—	—	—	—	—
NHL totals			477	88	111	199	516	56	13	12	25	107
