= Steve Mears =

American sportscaster

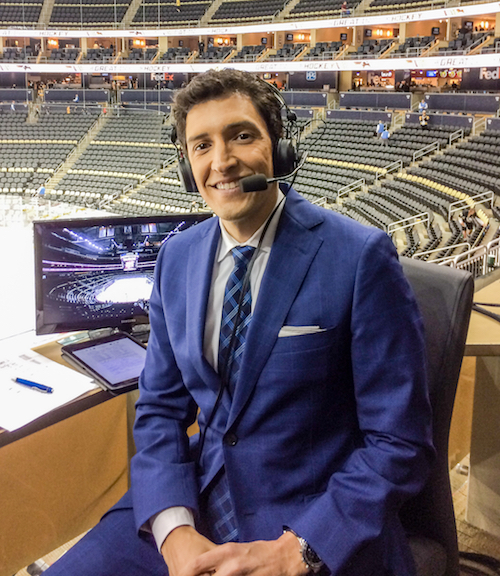
- Mears in 2018
- Born: January 22, 1980 (age 46); Murrysville, Pennsylvania
- Education: Bowling Green State University
- Occupations: Columbus Blue Jackets Television Play-by-Play Announcer (2024–Present); Pittsburgh Penguins Television / Radio Play-by-Play Announcer (2017–2024); 3ICE Play-by-Play Announcer (2022-Present); US Open Play-by-Play (2020, 2021); Host of NHL Now (2013–2017) Bossier-Shreveport Mudbugs Media Director (2002–2006)

Steve Mears (born January 22, 1980) is the television play-by-play voice of the Columbus Blue Jackets. He has also called select NHL games for TNT since 2024. He previously delivered play-by-play commentary for the Pittsburgh Penguins.

== Personal life and education ==
Steve Mears grew up in Murrysville, Pennsylvania, where he attended Franklin Regional High School. He then attended college at Bowling Green State University where he was the play-by-play voice of the BGSU Falcons. He graduated from Bowling Green State University in 2002. Steve married his wife Kirstin in 2022 and they welcomed their first child, Carter, in 2023.

== Career ==
=== Central Hockey League and NHL radio broadcasting ===
Mears served as director of media relations and broadcasting for the Bossier-Shreveport Mudbugs of the Central Hockey League from 2002 to 2006. He was named the Central Hockey League Broadcaster of the Year in 2005. In the summer of 2006, Mears accepted a position as the radio play-by-play broadcaster for the New York Islanders of the National Hockey League. Mears made his NHL broadcasting debut on October 5, 2006, during a New York Islanders vs Phoenix Coyotes game. Mears stayed with the Islanders for three seasons before joining the Pittsburgh Penguins Radio Network. He served four seasons with the Penguins, covering their radio and TV game broadcasts, hosting "Penguins Live" on Pittsburgh Penguins 24/7 Radio, and contributing to PensTV on the official team website.

=== NHL Network ===
In 2012, Mears made his NHL Network debut when he provided coverage of the 2012 NHL Stanley Cup Playoffs and Stanley Cup Finals. Mears officially joined the NHL Network team in February 2013 as the co-host of NHL Now. During the hockey season, Mears hosted NHL Now! from 4:00–6:00 PM EST Monday-Friday on the NHL Network alongside E.J. Hradek and Michelle McMahon. Aside from NHL Now, Mears also anchored video segments for NHL.com and called play-by-play for the IIHF World Junior Championships.

=== Pittsburgh Penguins ===
On May 16, 2017, Mears was named the play-by-play television announcer for broadcasts on AT&T SportsNet for Pittsburgh Penguins games, replacing Paul Steigerwald. On September 1, 2023, following its acquisition of AT&T SportsNet Pittsburgh, Fenway Sports Group announced that Mears would not return to the TV booth. Fenway then hired the team's play-by-play radio announcer, Josh Getzoff, to replace Mears on the TV broadcasts, while he in turn was then selected by the team to replace Getzoff on radio.

=== 3ICE ===
Starting with the inaugural 2022 summer season, Mears was the play-by-play announcer for 3ICE on CBS Sports.

=== Columbus Blue Jackets ===
Mears was announced as the Columbus Blue Jackets television play-by-play announcer on July 2, 2024. He will work with color commentator Jody Shelley on Blue Jackets games being broadcast via Bally Sports Ohio (Now FanDuel Sports Network).

Preceded by Paul Steigerwald	Pittsburgh Penguins television play-by-play announcer 2017–2023	Succeeded by Josh Getzoff
Preceded by Jeff Rimer	Columbus Blue Jackets television play-by-play announcer 2024–present	Succeeded by Incumbent
