= Pittsburgh Penguins Foundation =

Organization

- Type: Youth Development & Wellness
- Location: Pittsburgh, Pennsylvania
- Region served: Greater Pittsburgh Area
- Website: www.pittsburghpenguinsfoundation.org

The Pittsburgh Penguin's Foundation is a non-profit organization formed on July 20, 2010 in Pittsburgh, Pennsylvania. Sponsored by the National Hockey League (NHL)'s Pittsburgh Penguins, the foundation provides programs focused on preventive wellness, developmental support, and charitable activities. It also emphasizes teaching life skills and fostering engagement among youth and families through various activities.

== Programs ==
=== HeadsUP Pittsburgh ===
HeadsUP Pittsburgh was initiated in 2011 by the Foundation in collaboration with UPMC Sports Medicine to inform young athletes about concussions. This program aims to raise awareness among parents and children about concussion symptoms, causes, and recovery.

Initially, the program provided free baseline concussion testing for young hockey players in the Pennsylvania Interscholastic Hockey League (PIHL), the Pittsburgh Amateur Hockey League (PAHL), and other local youth ice hockey groups affiliated with USA Hockey.

Similar to the evaluations administered to NHL players, these tests assess the athlete's cognitive function, including processing speed, memory, and visual-motor skills. In the event of a concussion, the baseline results provide a reference point for comparing the athlete's pre-injury cognitive state to their current condition. The testing is done by the UPMC Sports Concussion group on the computer program Impact.

=== Pens FIT ===
Beginning in the 2012-13 school year, the Pittsburgh Penguins Foundation launched Pens FIT, with the aim of introducing kids to hockey and promoting physical activity. They provided free ball hockey gear and lesson plans to 260 elementary schools in Allegheny County. Collaborating with the Pittsburgh Penguins and California University of Pennsylvania, they developed a street hockey curriculum suitable for schools and community centers. Pens FIT offers teacher training, instruction, and continuing education sessions with Penguins coaching staff and alumni. Funded entirely by proceeds from the 2011 Civic Arena Roof ornament sales, Pens FIT is a three-year initiative expanding beyond Allegheny County by the end of 2024

=== Project Power Play ===
The Pittsburgh Penguins Foundation launched Project Power Play as a proactive measure to tackle the issue of sedentary habits among young Americans. This initiative aims to encourage enjoyable, structured physical activity. Leveraging the increasing popularity of hockey in the western Pennsylvania tri-state area, Project Power Play facilitates access to newly constructed outdoor athletic facilities. These venues offer safe environments for organized games, overseen by established organizations.

In collaboration with Highmark, the Pittsburgh Penguins Foundation has completed the construction of two Dek hockey rinks in Pittsburgh: one at Banks Ville Park and another at Lewis Park in Hazelwood. The overall project, valued at $2.1 million, includes plans to build 10 more facilities over the next three years in Allegheny County and neighboring communities.

Each rink within the 12 planned facilities features a durable steel dasher board system, a sports court surface, and is enclosed by a cyclone fence. A Project Power Play start-up kit is provided, offering fundamental skills guidance and game instructions through manuals. Pittsburgh Penguins staff will organize skill sessions, instructions, and scrimmage games, with ongoing support for the facilities provided by the Penguins organization.

=== Learn To Play ===
Through the combined efforts of Sidney Crosby, the Pittsburgh Penguins, Penguins Foundation, Reebok, and Dick's Sporting Goods, Sidney Crosby's Little Penguins Learn to Play Hockey program has introduced more than 4,200 Pittsburgh-area children to the game of hockey.

The Learn to Play program was started in the 2008–09 hockey season with the goal to provide boys and girls, ages 4–8, with hockey equipment and instruction to foster a love of the sport and give children an opportunity to play.

In the 2012–13 season, 1,000 children received free head-to-toe Reebok SC87 equipment, distributed by Dick's Sporting Goods, and the opportunity to learn at one of the 26 participating facilities, including four designed specifically for girls.

=== Hockey Is For Everyone ===
Fundraising efforts in 2011 enabled the Pittsburgh Penguins Foundation to dramatically increase their grant assistance and support for Hockey is for Everyone initiatives. The Mighty Penguins, Steel City Icebergs, and Pittsburgh I.C.E. each received grants through 2011 Civic Arena Roof ornament sales.

=== Mighty Penguins ===
Sled Hockey provides a means for physically challenged individuals to play competitive ice hockey.

=== Steel City Icebergs ===
An adaptive ice hockey program for both children and adults with developmental disabilities such as Autism, Down Syndrome, and traumatic brain injury.

=== Pittsburgh I.C.E. (Inclusion Creates Equality) ===
Pittsburgh I.C.E. provides the opportunity to play ice hockey for children who might never have the opportunity otherwise.

=== Explorers Series ===
In August 2012, the Pittsburgh Penguins Foundation invited children and parents to explore the world through their Explorers Series. The CONSOL Energy Center was transformed into a classroom as 500 families learned through education films, demonstrations and hands-on activities.

Children were encouraged to explore, experience, and learn about Robotics. Future topics for the Explorers Series topics include Space Exploration, and the Environment.

== Signature Events ==
=== Skates & Plates Charity Gala presented by Trib Total Media ===
Since 1986, the Penguins have hosted an annual charity gala for the benefit of local children's charities that focus on medical research. The events have raised over $5.75 million.

In 2009, the Pittsburgh Penguins re-organized the team's gala and hosted its signature event, the Skates & Plates Charity Gala presented by Trib Total Media, to benefit the Pittsburgh Penguins Foundation, Mario Lemieux Foundation, and Western Pennsylvania Chapter of the Cystic Fibrosis Foundation.

Penguins players don tuxedos and pass plates instead of pucks as they greet guests and serve as waiters for the evening.

Along with dinner, the event features a unique silent auction. Prizes are also awarded to guests for the top tips (guests’ tips are actually a donation to the event's selected charities) collected by the players.

=== Wine Tasting Gala presented by Highmark ===
The Pittsburgh Penguins Foundation annually hosts a Wine Tasting Gala and VIP Dinner at CONSOL Energy Center. The event benefits the Pittsburgh Penguins Foundation and helps the foundation continue its numerous efforts in the western Pennsylvania community.

=== Charity Auction on SportsNet Pittsburgh ===
The Penguins Foundation and Mario Lemieux Foundation teamed up for their second Charity Auction on ROOT Sports in March 2013. Fans attending the team's March 26 home game had an opportunity to purchase mystery bags full of Penguins memorabilia; each bag also included an autographed item from one of the players or Penguins alumni.

For fans not in attendance, SportsNet Pittsburgh dedicates their broadcast to the auction by promoting the sale of the bags online, along with a variety of exciting auction items that could be bid on through the Pittsburgh Penguins Foundation website. All proceeds benefitted the Mario Lemieux Foundation for cancer research and neonatal research, as well as Pittsburgh Penguins Foundation youth charities.

=== Hockey Fights Cancer ===
Hockey Fights Cancer (HFC) is an initiative founded in December 1998 by the National Hockey League and the National Hockey League Players' Association to raise money and awareness for hockey's most important fight. To date, through the NHL's US and Canadian charitable foundations, more than $12.8 million has been raised under the HFC initiative to support national and local cancer research institutions, children's hospitals, player charities and local cancer organizations. The HFC program is also a component of the NHL's "Biggest Assist Happens Off The Ice" campaign – the League's long-standing tradition of addressing important social issues in North America and around the world.

The Hockey Fights Cancer program is supported by each NHL Member Club, players, NHL Alumni, the NHL Officials' Association, Professional Hockey Trainers and Equipment Managers, corporate marketing partners, broadcast partners, and fans throughout North America.

=== Open Practice ===
Since 2010, the Pittsburgh Penguins and Pittsburgh Penguins Foundation have hosted an Open Hockey Practice for students at CONSOL Energy Center. The event offers a rare opportunity to more than 10,000 children from across Allegheny County and in grades one through eight to see the Penguins at work.

Students are entertained leading up to the start of practice with informational videos about behind-the-scenes aspects of the team and facility. Students are given the opportunity to ask questions of the players and coaches during and after practice. The Open Practice incorporates educational themes (math, geography, etc.) and each student is given an activity book focused on education, health and nutrition to take home.

=== Summer Sticks presented by UPMC ===
Every autumn, the Pittsburgh Penguins host a golf tournament and spend a day on the links for charity. The scramble-style tournament features teams of three, each accompanied by a Penguins celebrity captain, competing for tournament prizes. Proceeds from this event benefit the Pittsburgh Penguins Foundation.

== Fundraising ==
=== Pittsburgh Penguins Foundation 50/50 RAFFLE ===
After the Commonwealth of Pennsylvania passed a measure legalizing 50/50 drawings in 2013, the Pittsburgh Penguins Foundation began hosting a 50/50 RAFFLE to help local charities raise funds.

The Pittsburgh Penguins Foundation hosts a 50/50 RAFFLE at all Pittsburgh Penguins home games, and one participating fan wins 50% of the collected amount at each game. For the balance, a majority of the remaining amount is directed to that game's selected charity with the remainder distributed by the Pittsburgh Penguins Foundation to a local 501c3 charity. A different charity is selected to participate in each game.
