= Pittsburgh Penguins =

National Hockey League team in Pittsburgh, Pennsylvania

- 2026–27 Pittsburgh Penguins season
- Conference: Eastern
- Division: Metropolitan
- Founded: 1967
- History: Pittsburgh Penguins; 1967–present
- Home arena: PPG Paints Arena
- City: Pittsburgh, Pennsylvania
- Team colors: Black, Pittsburgh gold, white
- Media: SportsNet Pittsburgh; The X (105.9 FM); ESPN Pittsburgh (970 AM); Pittsburgh Penguins Radio Network
- Owner(s): Hoffmann Family of Companies; Mario Lemieux (minority)
- General manager: Kyle Dubas
- Head coach: Dan Muse
- Captain: Sidney Crosby
- Minor league affiliates: Wilkes-Barre/Scranton Penguins (AHL); Florida Everblades (ECHL)
- Stanley Cups: 5 (1990–91, 1991–92, 2008–09, 2015–16, 2016–17)
- Conference championships: 6 (1990–91, 1991–92, 2007–08, 2008–09, 2015–16, 2016–17)
- Presidents' Trophies: 1 (1992–93)
- Division championships: 9 (1990–91, 1992–93, 1993–94, 1995–96, 1997–98, 2007–08, 2012–13, 2013–14, 2020–21)
- Official website: nhl.com/penguins

The Pittsburgh Penguins (colloquially known as the Pens) are a professional ice hockey team based in Pittsburgh. The Penguins compete in the National Hockey League (NHL) as a member of the Metropolitan Division in the Eastern Conference. The team has played its home games at PPG Paints Arena since 2010, and has previously played at the Civic Arena, which was better known by its nickname "the Igloo". The Penguins are affiliated with two minor league teams – the Wilkes-Barre/Scranton Penguins of the American Hockey League (AHL) and the Florida Everblades of the ECHL.

Founded during the 1967 expansion, the Penguins have qualified for six Stanley Cup Finals, winning the Stanley Cup five times – in 1991, 1992, 2009, 2016, and 2017. Along with the Edmonton Oilers, the Penguins are tied for the most Stanley Cup championships among the non-Original Six teams and sixth overall. With their Stanley Cup wins in 2016 and 2017, the Penguins became the first back-to-back champions in the salary cap era. Several of the team's former members have been inducted into the Hockey Hall of Fame, including co-owner Mario Lemieux, who purchased the Penguins in 1999 and brought the club out of bankruptcy. Lemieux, Jaromír Jágr, Sidney Crosby, and Evgeni Malkin have won the Hart Memorial Trophy while playing for the franchise.

== History ==
=== Early years (1967–1984) ===
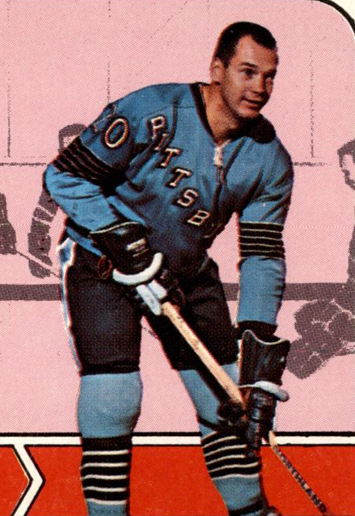
Ab McDonald (pictured in the original blue uniforms) was the first captain of the Penguins in the first season of the franchise in 1967; he played 74 games before he was traded the following season

Prior to the arrival of the Penguins, Pittsburgh had been the home of the NHL's Pittsburgh Pirates from 1925 to 1930 and of the American Hockey League's Pittsburgh Hornets franchise from 1936 to 1967 (with a short break from 1956 to 1961). In the spring of 1965, Jack McGregor, a state senator from Kittanning, Pennsylvania, began lobbying campaign contributors and community leaders to bring an NHL franchise back to Pittsburgh. The group focused on leveraging the NHL as an urban renewal tool for Pittsburgh. The senator formed a group of local investors that included H. J. Heinz Company heir H. J. Heinz III, Pittsburgh Steelers' owner Art Rooney and the Mellon family's Richard Mellon Scaife. The projected league expansion depended on securing votes from the then-current NHL owners; to ensure Pittsburgh would be selected as one of the expansion cities, McGregor enlisted Rooney to petition votes from James D. Norris, owner of the Chicago Black Hawks and his brother Bruce Norris, owner of the Detroit Red Wings. The effort was successful, and on February 8, 1966, the National Hockey League awarded an expansion team to Pittsburgh for the 1967–68 season. The Penguins paid $2.5 million ($25.1 million today) for their entry and $750,000 ($7.2 million today) more for start-up costs. The Civic Arena's capacity was boosted from 10,732 to 12,500 to meet the NHL requirements for expansion. The Penguins also paid an indemnification bill to settle with the Detroit Red Wings, which owned the Pittsburgh Hornets franchise. The investor group named McGregor president and chief executive officer, and he represented Pittsburgh on the NHL's Board of Governors.

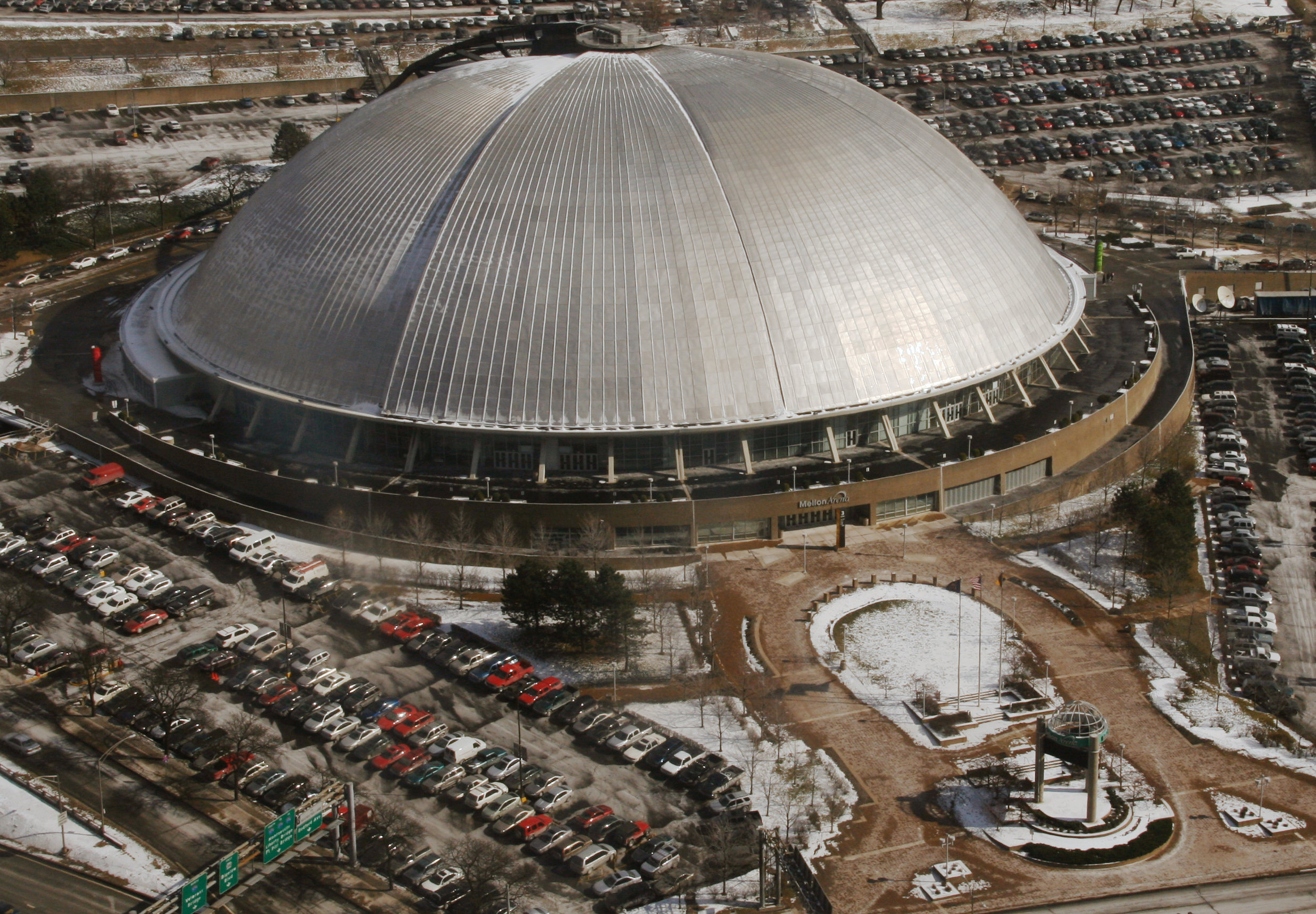
The Civic Arena's capacity was increased to meet NHL requirements for a franchise. The arena served as the Penguins' home arena from 1967 to 2010.

A contest was held where 700 of 26,000 entries picked "Penguins" as the team's nickname, sharing its nickname with the athletic department of the newly named Youngstown State University in nearby Youngstown, Ohio; Youngstown is part of the Penguins' territorial rights to this day, though they did briefly share them with the Cleveland Barons in the mid-1970s. Mark Peters had the winning entry, which was inspired because the team was to play in the "Igloo", the nickname of the Pittsburgh Civic Arena, a logo was chosen that had a penguin in front of a triangle, which symbolized the "Golden Triangle" of downtown Pittsburgh. The Penguins' first general manager, Jack Riley, opened the first pre-season camp for the franchise in Brantford, Ontario, on September 13, 1967, playing the franchise's first exhibition match in Brantford against the Philadelphia Flyers on September 23, 1967. Restrictive rules which kept most major talent with the existing "Original Six" teams hampered the Penguins, along with the rest of the expansion teams. Beyond aging sniper Andy Bathgate, all-star defenseman Leo Boivin (who had begun his professional career with the Hornets) and New York Rangers' veteran Earl Ingarfield, a cast of former minor leaguers largely manned the first Penguins' team. Several players played for the Hornets the previous season: Bathgate, wingers Val Fonteyne and Ab McDonald, and goaltenders Hank Bassen and Joe Daley. George Sullivan was named the head coach for the club's first two seasons, and McDonald was named the team's first captain.

On October 11, 1967, league president Clarence Campbell and McGregor jointly dropped the ceremonial first puck of the Penguins' opening home game against the Montreal Canadiens. On October 21, 1967, they became the first team from the expansion class to defeat an Original Six team, as they defeated the Chicago Black Hawks 4–2. However, the Penguins went 27–34–13 and finished in fifth place in the West Division, missing the playoffs and ending with the third-worst record in the league. The team's best player proved to be longtime Cleveland Barons AHL goaltender Les Binkley, who recorded a 2.88 goals-against average and was second in the league with six shutouts. Defensive winger Ken Schinkel won the team's sole league honor, being named to represent the Penguins in the NHL All-Star Game. Bathgate led the team in scoring with 59 points but retired at season's end. McDonald, who led the team in goals and was second in team scoring, was also gone at season's end, traded to the St. Louis Blues in exchange for center Lou Angotti.

The next season saw the team slip in the standings amid a sharp drop in form by Binkley, into sixth place and with the league's worst record. Several changes were made to improve the team, resulting in Boivin and several others being traded, and new players – including longtime future Penguins star Jean Pronovost – making their debuts. No captain was named to replace McDonald; the team went with four alternate captains.

==== Triumph of playoff berths and tragedy of Briere (1969–1974) ====
Michel Brière's number was taken out of circulation after his career-ending accident in 1970. It was later formally retired in 2001.

In the 1969 draft the Penguins selected Michel Brière who, although being chosen 26th, was soon drawing comparisons to Phil Esposito and Bobby Clarke. Joining the team in November, he finished as the second-place rookie scorer in the NHL (behind Bobby Clarke) with 44 points (57th overall), and third on the Penguins. Briere placed second in Calder Memorial Trophy voting for Rookie of the Year honors behind Chicago goaltender Tony Esposito. Briere led Pittsburgh to its first NHL playoff berth since the 1928 Pirates. The Penguins defeated the Oakland Seals in a four-game sweep in the quarterfinals, with Briere scoring the series-clinching goal in overtime. In the semifinals, defending conference champions St. Louis Blues got the best of the Penguins during six games. Briere led the team in playoff scoring, recording five goals (including three game-winners) and eight points. Tragedy struck the Penguins just days after their playoff heroics. On May 15, 1970, Briere was in a car crash in his native Quebec, suffering brain trauma and slipping into a coma from which he would never recover; he died a year later. His number 21 jersey was never reissued, remaining out of circulation until it was formally retired in 2001.

In the 1970–71 season, the Penguins finished five games out of the playoffs with a 21–37–20 record, the fourth-worst record in the league. Pittsburgh achieved a playoff berth in 1972, only to be swept by the Chicago Black Hawks in the first round. Except for a handful of players like Ken Schinkel, Pronovost, Syl Apps Jr., Keith McCreary, agitator Bryan Watson and goaltender Les Binkley, talent was thin, but enough for the Penguins to reach the playoffs in both 1970 and 1972.

The Penguins battled the California Golden Seals for the division cellar in 1974, when Riley was fired as general manager and replaced by Jack Button. Button obtained Steve Durbano, Ab DeMarco, Bob "Battleship" Kelly and Bob Paradise through trades. The personnel moves proved successful, and the team improved to a 28–41–9 record, although they remained nine points away from a playoff berth.

However, in early 1975, the Penguins' creditors demanded payment of back debts, forcing the team into bankruptcy. The doors to the team's offices were padlocked, and it looked like the Penguins would fold or relocate. Around the same time, rumors began circulating that the Penguins and the California Golden Seals were to be relocated to Seattle and Denver respectively, the two cities that were to have been the sites of an expansion for the 1976–77 season. Through the intervention of a group that included former Minnesota North Stars head coach Wren Blair, the team was prevented from folding and remained in Pittsburgh, eventually being bought by shopping mall magnate Edward J. DeBartolo, Sr.

==== Playoff runs and a uniform change (1974–1982) ====
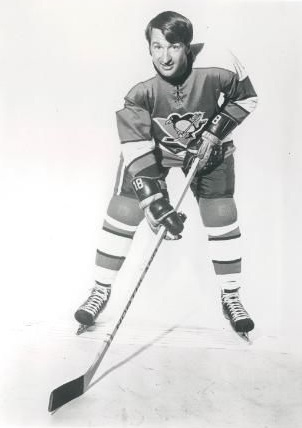
During the mid-1970s, Lowell MacDonald was paired with Syl Apps Jr. and Jean Pronovost, forming the "Century Line". MacDonald played with the Penguins from 1970 to 1978.

Beginning in the mid-1970s, Pittsburgh iced some powerful offensive clubs, led by the likes of the "Century Line" of Syl Apps, Lowell MacDonald and Jean Pronovost. They nearly reached the semifinals in 1975, but were ousted from the playoffs by the New York Islanders in one of the only four best-of-seven-game series in NHL history where a team came back from being down three games to none. As the 1970s wore on, a mediocre team defense neutralized the Penguins' success beyond the regular season. Baz Bastien, a former coach and general manager of the AHL's Hornets, later became general manager. The Penguins missed the playoffs in 1977–78. Bastien traded prime draft picks for several players whose best years were already behind them, and the team would suffer in the early 1980s as a result. The decade closed with a playoff appearance in 1979 and a rousing opening series win over the Buffalo Sabres before a second-round sweep at the hands of the Boston Bruins.

The Penguins began the 1980s by changing their team colors; in January 1980, the team switched from wearing blue and white to their present-day scheme of black and gold to honor Pittsburgh's other sports teams, the Pittsburgh Pirates and the Pittsburgh Steelers, as well as the Flag of Pittsburgh. Both the Pirates and Steelers had worn black and gold for decades, and both had enjoyed world championship seasons. The Bruins protested this color change, claiming a monopoly on black and gold, but the Penguins defended their choice stating that the NHL Pirates also used black and gold as their team colors and that black and gold were Pittsburgh's traditional sporting colors. The NHL agreed, and Pittsburgh could use black and gold. The Penguins officially debuted the black and gold uniform in a game against the St. Louis Blues at the Civic Arena on January 30, 1980. On the ice, the Penguins began the 1980s with defenseman Randy Carlyle, and prolific scorers Paul Gardner and Mike Bullard but little else.

During the early part of the decade, the Penguins made a habit of being a tough draw for higher-seeded opponents in the playoffs. In 1980, the 13th-seeded Penguins took the Bruins to the limit in their first-round playoff series. The following season, as the 15th seed, they lost the decisive game of their first-round series in overtime to the heavily favored St. Louis Blues. Then, in the 1982 playoffs, the Penguins held a 3–1 lead late in the fifth and final game of their playoff series against the reigning champions, the New York Islanders. However, the Islanders rallied to force overtime and won the series on a goal by John Tonelli, who had tied the game before. It would be the Penguins' final playoff appearance until 1989.

=== Lemieux–Jágr era (1984–2005) ===
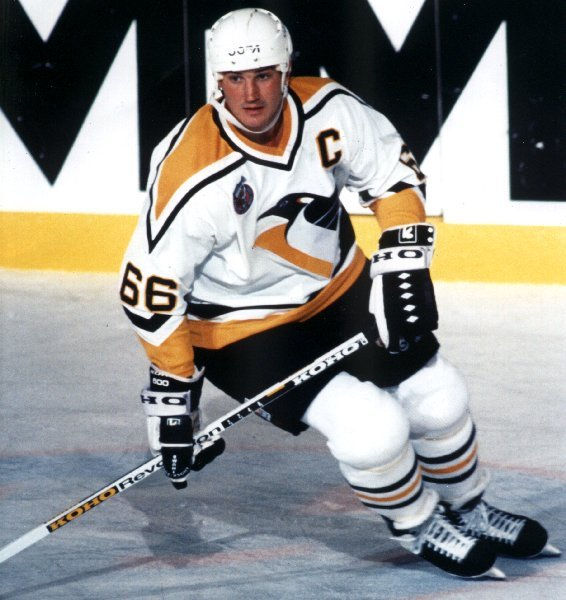
Mario Lemieux played for the Penguins in two stints (1984–1997, 2000–2006).

The team had the league's worst record in both the 1982–83 and 1983–84 seasons. With the team suffering financial problems, it seemed the Penguins would either fold or relocate. Mario Lemieux, one of the most highly touted NHL draft picks in history, was due to be drafted in the 1984 NHL entry draft. Heading towards the end of the season ahead of the New Jersey Devils, who were placed last, the Penguins made several questionable moves that appeared to weaken the team in the short term. They posted three six-game winless streaks in the last 21 games of the season and earned the right to draft Lemieux amidst protests from Devils' management. Pittsburgh head coach Lou Angotti later admitted that a conscious decision was made to finish the season as the team with the worst record, saying in an interview with the Pittsburgh Post-Gazette that a mid-season lunch prompted the plan, because there was a high chance of the franchise folding if Lemieux was not drafted. Other teams offered substantial trade packages for the draft choice, but the Penguins kept the pick and drafted Lemieux first overall. Lemieux paid dividends right away, scoring on his first-ever shot of his first-ever NHL shift in his first NHL game. However, the team spent four more years out of the playoffs after his arrival. In the late 1980s, the Penguins finally gave Lemieux a strong supporting cast, trading for superstar defenseman Paul Coffey from the Edmonton Oilers (after the Oilers' 1987 Stanley Cup win) and bringing in young talent like scorers Kevin Stevens, Rob Brown and John Cullen from the minors. The team finally acquired a top-flight goaltender with the acquisition of Tom Barrasso from Buffalo. All this talent had an immediate impact in helping Lemieux lead the Penguins; but the team struggled to make the playoffs. In 1985–86, the Penguins missed the playoffs on the final day of the season by one game. In 1986–87, they missed the playoffs by just two games and saw four teams with equal or worse records qualify. In 1987–88, for the second time in a row, the Penguins missed the playoffs by one game.

In 1989, Pittsburgh finally broke through the barrier and made the playoffs on the back of Lemieux leading the league in goals, assists and points. On December 31, 1988, Lemieux became the only player in history to score a goal in all five possible game situations in the same game (even strength, shorthanded, penalty shot, power play, and empty net). The Penguins defeated the New York Rangers in a four-game sweep in the first round; however, the Philadelphia Flyers halted their progress in the second round. The seven-game defeat featured Lemieux scoring five goals in the fifth game.

==== Back-to-back Stanley Cup titles (1989–1992) ====
A herniated disc in Lemieux's back cut short his 1989–90 season, although he still amassed 123 points. However, the Penguins fell out of the playoff picture. They opted to strengthen their roster and support Lemieux in the 1990 off-season. Free-agent signings (Bryan Trottier) and trades (Joe Mullen, Larry Murphy, Ron Francis and Ulf Samuelsson) played a major part in this. Arguably no move was bigger during this time than when the Penguins drafted Jaromír Jágr with the fifth overall pick in the 1990 NHL entry draft. The first Czechoslovak player to be drafted into the NHL without first needing to defect to the West, Jágr became the Penguins' second franchise player, and quickly developed into a superstar offensive talent. The roster overhaul culminated in the Penguins winning their first Stanley Cup title by defeating the Minnesota North Stars in the Stanley Cup Final in six games, punctuated by an 8–0 victory in the deciding game, the largest margin of victory in a final Stanley Cup game in over 80 years. After the 1991 Stanley Cup Final, the Penguins met with President George H. W. Bush, the first NHL team ever to visit the White House. The following season, the team lost coach Bob Johnson to cancer, and Scotty Bowman took over as coach. Under Bowman, they swept the Chicago Blackhawks to repeat as Stanley Cup champions in 1991–92.

Cancer diagnosis revisited the Penguins in 1993 when Lemieux was diagnosed with Hodgkin lymphoma. Only two months after the diagnosis, missing 24 out of 84 games, he came back to win his fourth Art Ross Trophy as scoring champion with 160 points, edging out Pat LaFontaine and Adam Oates. Despite the off-ice difficulties, Pittsburgh finished with a 56–21–7 record, the franchise's best regular season ever, winning the Presidents' Trophy. After Lemieux's return, the team played better than it had before, winning an NHL-record 17 consecutive games. Despite all of the success, the 1993 playoffs ended in the division finals when the New York Islanders eliminated the Penguins in seven games.

==== Continued contending (1993–1996) ====
The Penguins continued to be a formidable team throughout the 1990s. The stars of the Stanley Cup years were followed by the likes of forwards: Alexei Kovalev, Martin Straka, Aleksey Morozov, Robert Lang and Petr Nedvěd, and defensemen Sergei Zubov, Darius Kasparaitis and Kevin Hatcher. Despite the departure of many of the franchise's Stanley Cup-winning roster, the Penguins fielded enough talent to reach the first round of the playoffs in 1994 (where they lost to the Washington Capitals in six games), the second round in 1995 (where they lost to the New Jersey Devils in five games) and the conference finals in 1996 (where they lost to the Florida Panthers in seven games). The 1997 playoffs marked a turning point, as the Penguins suffered a first-round elimination at the hands of the rival Philadelphia Flyers in five games.

==== Lemieux's retirement and return (1997–2001) ====
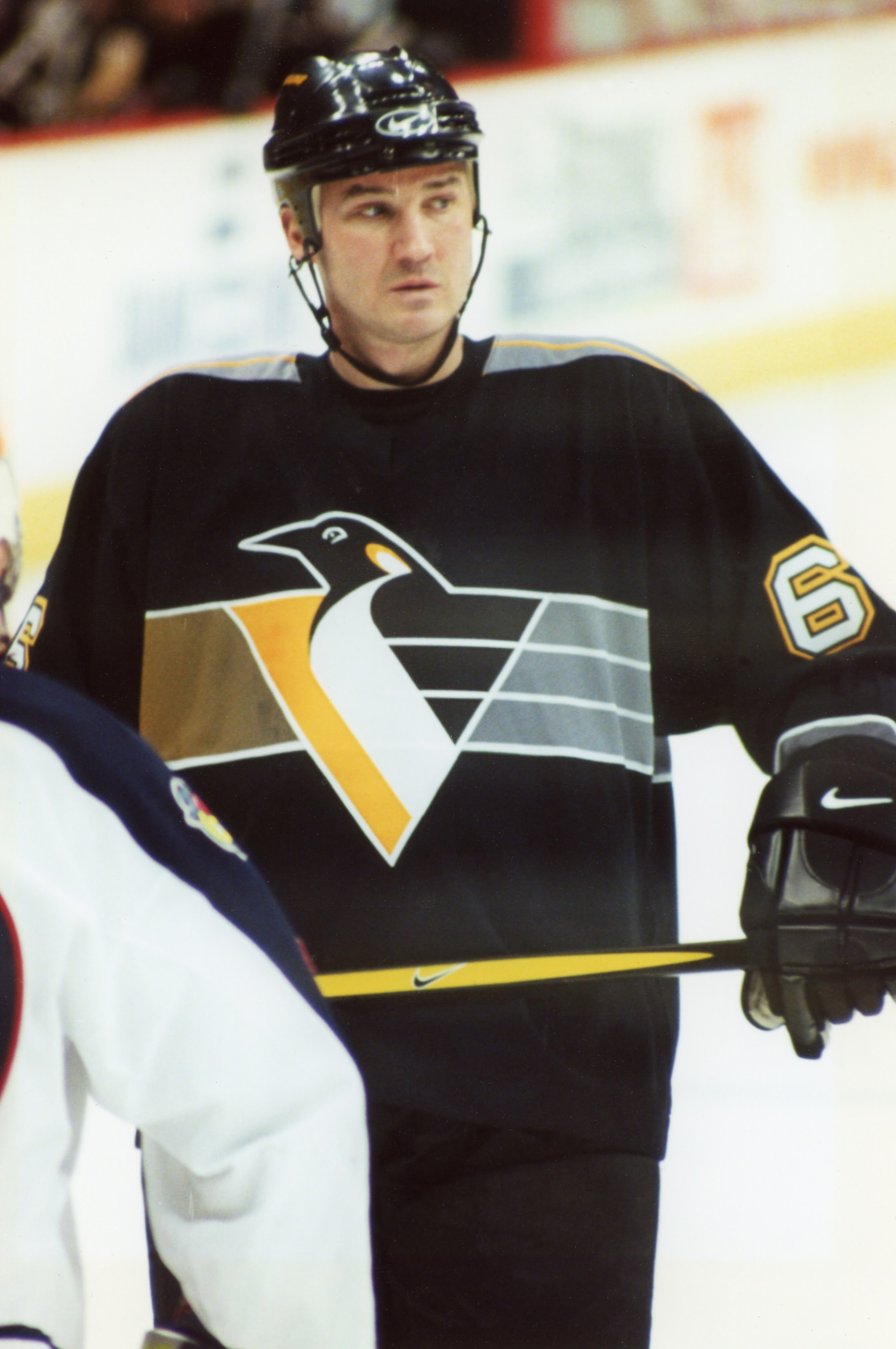
Lemieux with the Penguins during the 2000–01 season, his first season after coming out of retirement.

On April 6, 1997, the franchise was rocked when Mario Lemieux, citing ongoing health concerns and his disapproval with the way NHL hockey was being officiated, announced he would retire at the conclusion of the 1997 playoffs. Lemieux was so respected in the NHL, and his achievements over the course of his career were so great, that he was inducted into the Hockey Hall of Fame in the year he retired, the three-year waiting period being waived. His departure was the first in a series of events that would once again lead the Penguins into regular season stagnation, and to the brink of financial ruin.

The Montreal Canadiens eliminated the team in the first round of the playoffs in 1998, despite being the second-seeded team in the East. The following year, their playoff run ended in the second round when they lost to the Toronto Maple Leafs in six games. In 2000, the Penguins stunned the highly touted Washington Capitals 4–1 in the first round, only to fall to the Philadelphia Flyers 4–2 in the second round.

By this time, the lofty contracts handed out during the early 1990s were catching up with the Penguins. At one point, the team owed over $90 million to numerous creditors, leading then-owners Howard Baldwin and Morris Belzberg (who bought the Penguins after their first Stanley Cup win) to ask the players to defer their salaries to help pay the bills. When the deferred salaries finally came due, combined with other financial pressures, the Penguins were forced to file for Chapter 11 bankruptcy in November 1998.

Lemieux then stepped in with an unusual proposal to buy the team out of bankruptcy. The Penguins owed Lemieux $32.5 million in deferred salary, making him the team's largest individual creditor. He proposed recovering this money by converting it into equity – enough to give him controlling interest. He also vowed to keep the team in Pittsburgh. The NHL and the courts agreed, and Lemieux (with help from supermarket tycoon Ronald Burkle) assumed control on September 3, 1999, saving the franchise for the second time.

Lemieux again shocked the hockey world by announcing at a press conference on December 8, 2000, his intentions to return to the Penguins as an active player. On December 27, 2000, Lemieux stepped onto NHL ice for the first time in 44 months, officially becoming the first player–owner in NHL history. Lemieux helped lead the Penguins deep into the 2001 playoffs, highlighted by an overtime victory against the Buffalo Sabres in game 7 of the second round. Darius Kasparaitis scored the series-clinching goal to advance the Penguins to the conference finals, where they lost in five games to the New Jersey Devils.

==== Rebuilding (2001–2005) ====
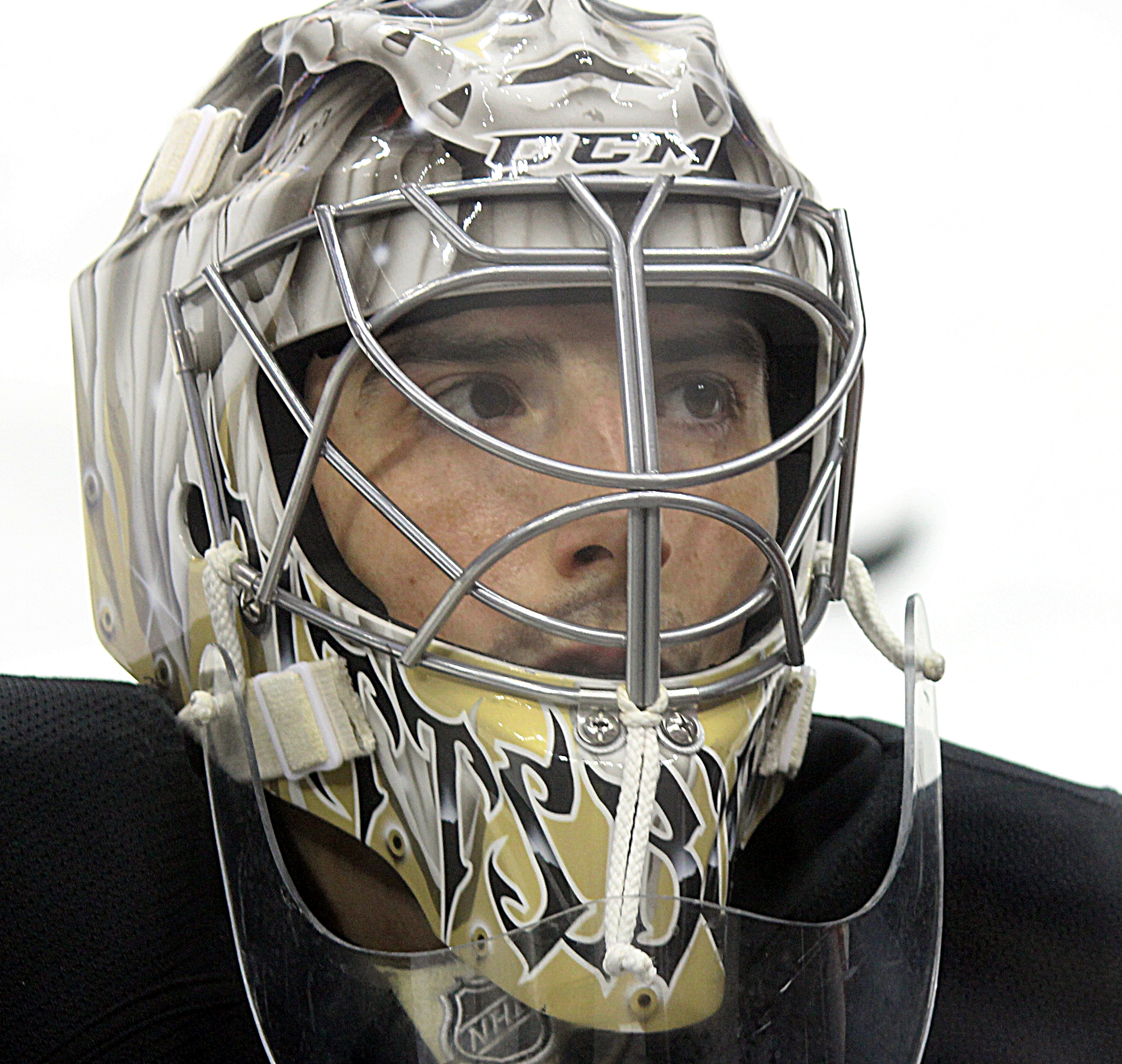
Marc-André Fleury was drafted first overall in 2003 by the Penguins.

The Penguins' attendance had dwindled in the late 1990s. In 1998–99, the club had an average attendance of 14,825 at home games, the lowest it had been since Lemieux's rookie year. Reducing revenue on top of the previous bankruptcy necessitated salary shedding. The biggest salary move was the trading of superstar Jaromír Jágr to the Washington Capitals in the summer of 2001. The Penguins missed the playoffs for the first time in 12 years in 2002, finishing in a tie for third-to-last in their conference. The following season they finished second-last. In the 2003 NHL entry draft, the Penguins selected goaltender Marc-André Fleury with the first overall pick.

The 2003–04 season was an ordeal with Lemieux missing all but 24 regular season games with a hip injury, and attendance dipping to an average of 11,877 (the lowest average of any NHL team), with just one sellout. As the season progressed, the Penguins signed new head coach (and former Penguins' player and commentator) Eddie Olczyk and opted not to include Fleury in the lineup for the bulk of the season. This culminated in the worst record in the NHL, with the team winning just 23 games. As in the 1980s, the Penguins' struggles were fortuitously concurrent with a string of NHL entry draft classes that would yield multiple world-class talents. The Penguins lost out on the first overall pick for the 2004 NHL entry draft (Alexander Ovechkin), which went to the Washington Capitals. However, Ovechkin's countryman, center Evgeni Malkin, was similarly highly regarded, and Pittsburgh took him with the second overall pick. However, a transfer dispute between the NHL and the International Ice Hockey Federation (IIHF) delayed his Pittsburgh debut.

By this point, the Penguins had collapsed financially since the Stanley Cup-winning years of the early 1990s. Their home venue, the Civic Arena, had become the oldest arena in the NHL, and Lemieux had tried unsuccessfully to cut a deal with the city for a new facility. With Pittsburgh uninterested in building a new hockey arena for the struggling Penguins, Lemieux began looking into the possibilities of selling or relocating the team to Kansas City, Missouri. A lockout prompted the cancellation of the 2004–05 NHL season. One of the many reasons for the lockout included disagreements on resolving the financial struggles of teams like the Penguins and the Ottawa Senators, which had filed for bankruptcy protection. During the lockout, the Penguins' players dispersed between the club's American Hockey League (AHL) affiliate, the Wilkes-Barre/Scranton Penguins, and to European leagues.

=== Crosby–Malkin era (2005–present) ===
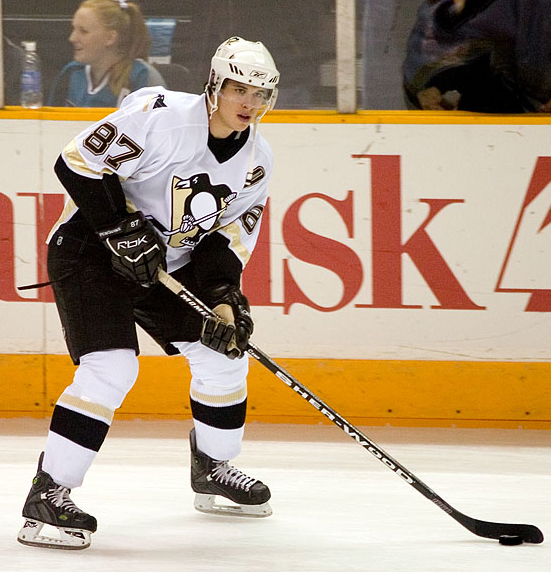
Sidney Crosby during his sophomore season with the Penguins. He was drafted first overall by the team in the 2005 draft.

With the lockout resolved in 2005, the NHL organized an unprecedented draft lottery to set the 2005 NHL entry draft selection order. The draft lottery, which was held behind closed doors in a "secure location", resulted in the Penguins being awarded the first overall pick. Quebec Major Junior Hockey League (QMJHL) superstar Sidney Crosby (who had been training with Lemieux over the summer) was the consensus first overall pick, with many referring to the draft lottery process as "The Sidney Crosby Sweepstakes". The Penguins selected Crosby on July 30, 2005, with the top pick, instantly rekindling interest in hockey in Pittsburgh.

The Penguins began rebuilding the team under the salary cap. However, Evgeni Malkin, the Penguins' 2004 draft pick, could not report to Pittsburgh immediately because of a playing rights dispute with the Russian Superleague. The addition of Crosby paid instant dividends, with attendance rising by approximately 4,000 per game on average in the 2005–06 season. However, Crosby's presence did not immediately translate into wins, as the team began the season with a long winless skid that resulted in a head coaching change from Olczyk to Michel Therrien. Then, on January 24, 2006, Lemieux announced his second retirement, after developing an irregular heartbeat, this time permanently. He finished as the NHL's seventh all-time scorer (1,723), eighth in goals (690) and tenth in assists (1,033), and with the second-highest career points per game average (1.88), which is second to Wayne Gretzky's 1.92.

Despite the team's struggles, Crosby established himself as a star in the league, amassing 102 points in his debut season and finishing second to Alexander Ovechkin for the Calder Memorial Trophy awarded each year to the league's top rookie. In the Penguins' final game of the season, Crosby tallied a goal and an assist to become the top-scoring rookie in Penguin history (eclipsing Lemieux). The Penguins again posted the worst record in the Eastern Conference and the highest goals-against total in the League. They received the second overall draft pick, their fourth top-two pick in four years, in the 2006 NHL entry draft, and selected touted two-way forward Jordan Staal. The team announced on April 20 they would not renew the contract for general manager Craig Patrick, who had been the general manager since December 1989. On May 25, Ray Shero signed a five-year contract as general manager.

==== Resurgence and third Stanley Cup title (2006–2010) ====
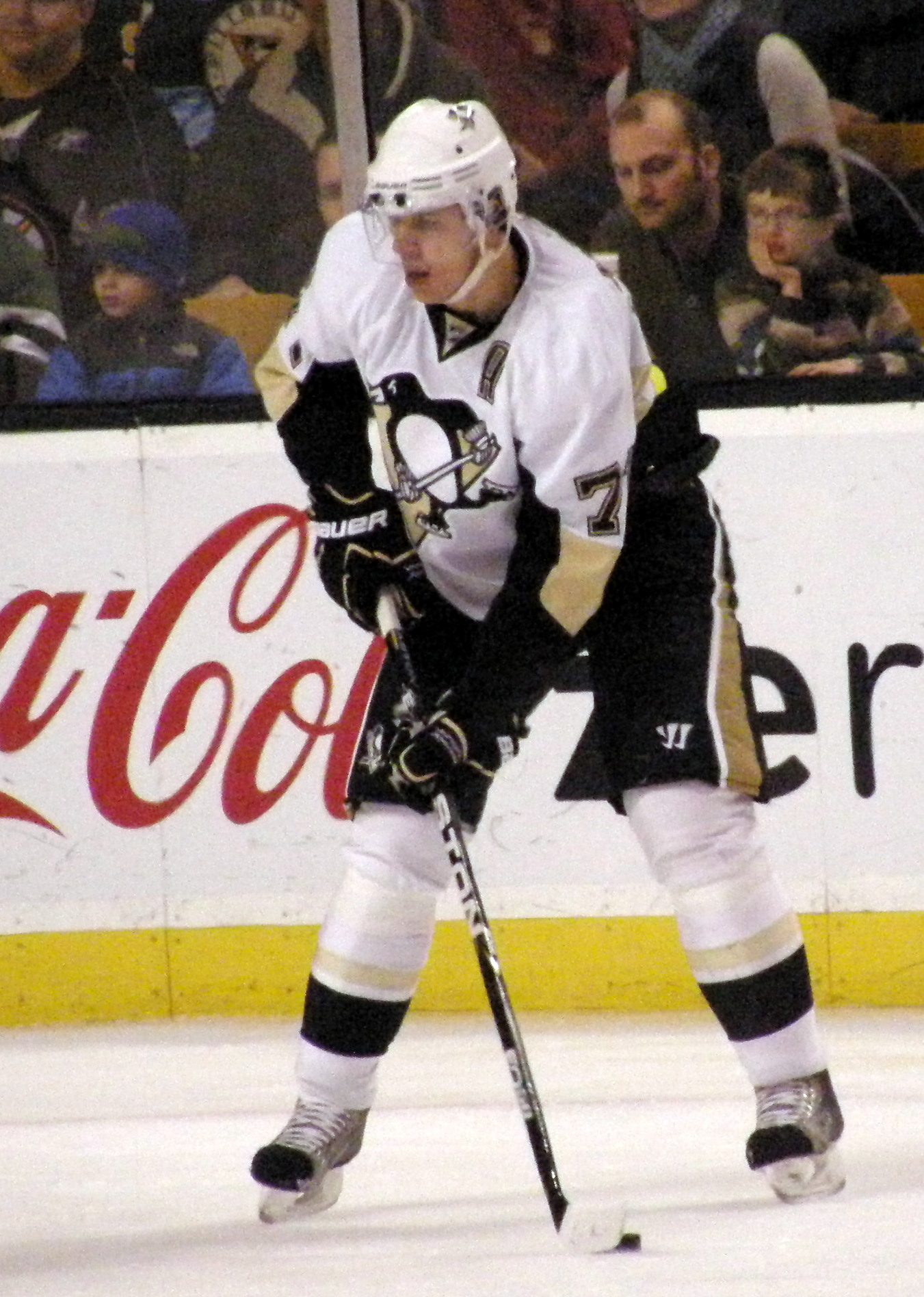
Evgeni Malkin made an immediate impact, driving the Penguins to their first playoff appearance in six years.

Change came for the Penguins on October 18, 2006, when Evgeni Malkin made his NHL debut. He set the modern NHL record with a goal in each of his first six games. Malkin would record points in 16 consecutive games. The Penguins finished the 2006–07 season in fifth place in the Eastern Conference with a record of 47–24–11, totaling 105 points, only two points behind the Atlantic Division winners, the New Jersey Devils. It was the franchise's first 100-point season in 11 years and represented an enormous 47-point leap from the previous season. In the first round of the 2007 playoffs the eventual Stanley Cup runners-up, the Ottawa Senators, defeated the Penguins 4–1. At the season's end, rookies Malkin and Jordan Staal were finalists for the Calder Memorial Trophy, awarded to the Rookie of the Year, which Malkin won.

On March 13, 2007, Pennsylvania's governor Ed Rendell, Allegheny County chief executive Dan Onorato, Pittsburgh's mayor Luke Ravenstahl and Mario Lemieux of the Penguins ownership group announced an agreement had been reached among the parties to build the long-sought arena. The completion of Consol Energy Center guaranteed that the Penguins would remain in Pittsburgh. Following the announcement of the plan, the Lemieux ownership group announced they no longer had plans to sell the team. On June 8, 2007, a $325 million bond was issued, and the Penguins signed a 30-year lease on September 19, binding them to the city of Pittsburgh through 2040.

After a mediocre start to the 2007–08 season, Crosby and starting goaltender Marc-André Fleury were both injured long-term due to high right ankle sprains. In their absence, the team flourished because of the play and leadership of Malkin. On April 2, 2008, the Penguins clinched the Atlantic Division title – their first division title in 10 years – with a 4–2 win against rivals the Philadelphia Flyers. Malkin finished the season with 106 points for second place in the league and finished as a finalist for the Hart Memorial Trophy. The team launched into their first extended playoff run in many years, beating Ottawa 4–0, defeating the New York Rangers 4–1 and then defeating the Philadelphia Flyers 4–1 to clinch the Prince of Wales Trophy. Pittsburgh lost the 2008 Stanley Cup Final to the Detroit Red Wings in six games, finishing the playoffs with a 14–6 record. Crosby finished the playoffs with 27 points (6 goals and 21 assists in 20 games), tying Conn Smythe Trophy-winner Henrik Zetterberg (13 goals and 14 assists in 22 games) for the playoff scoring lead.

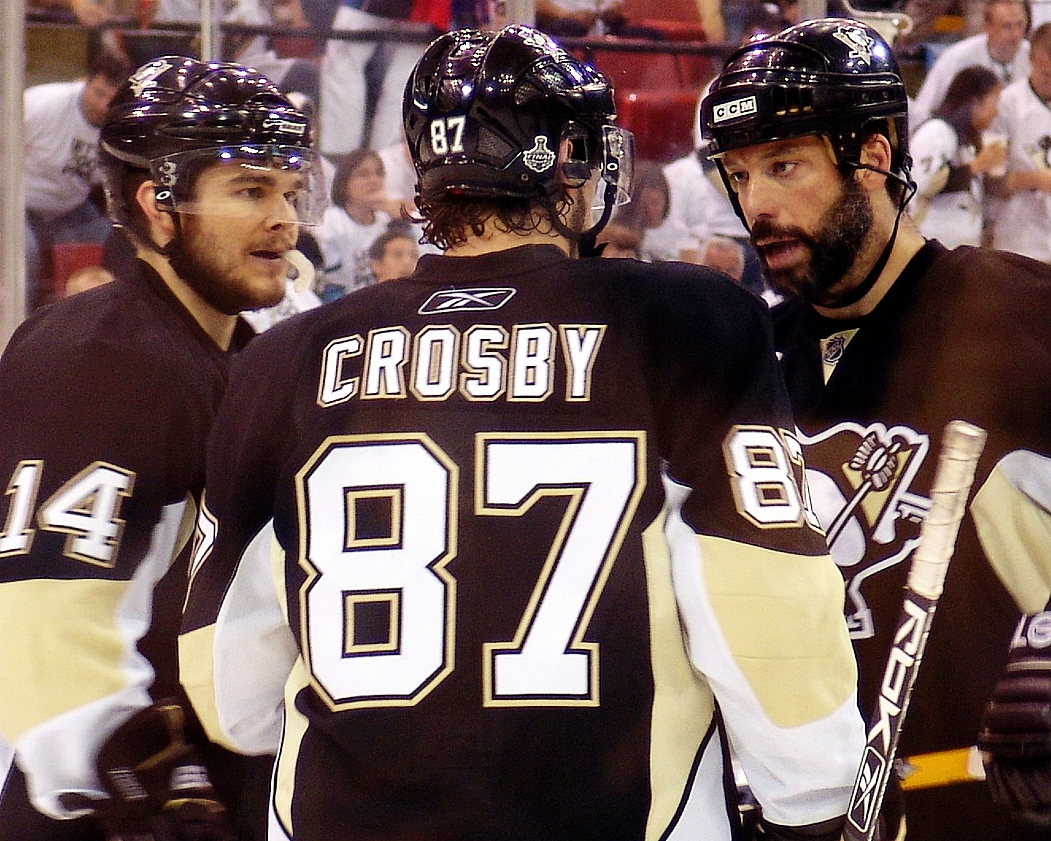
Crosby, Bill Guerin, and Chris Kunitz during the 2009 Stanley Cup Final. The Penguins defeated the Detroit Red Wings in series, earning their third Stanley Cup title.

In the 2008–09 season, Malkin won the Art Ross and was again a candidate for the Hart Memorial Trophy. Crosby finished third in League scoring with 33 goals and 70 assists for 103 points, despite missing five games. The Penguins' record dipped mid-season but lifted after Dan Bylsma replaced head coach Therrien. The effect was almost instantaneous, and the Penguins recovered enough to secure home-ice advantage in their first-round match up against the Philadelphia Flyers, whom the Penguins defeated in six games. It took seven games for the Penguins to win the next series against Washington, sending them to the conference finals, where they eliminated the Carolina Hurricanes in a four-game sweep. After defeating the Hurricanes, the Penguins earned their second consecutive trip to the Stanley Cup Final against the Detroit Red Wings, to whom they lost the previous year. After losing games 1 and 2 in Detroit, like the previous years, the Penguins won games 3 and 4 in Pittsburgh. Each team won on home ice in games 5 and 6. In game 7 in Detroit, Maxime Talbot scored two goals, including the game-winner, as the Penguins won 2–1 to win their third Stanley Cup title. Malkin was awarded the Conn Smythe Trophy as the MVP of the playoffs.

During the 2009–10 season, Crosby scored 109 points (51 goals and 58 assists) in 81 games, winning the Maurice "Rocket" Richard Trophy as the NHL season's leading goalscorer. The Penguins, seeded fourth in the East, began their title defense, defeating the Ottawa Senators in six games. In the next round, the Penguins faced the Montreal Canadiens. The teams swapped wins in the series en route to the decisive game 7, which the Penguins lost 5–2, ending their season and their tenure at Mellon Arena.

==== New arena and injuries (2010–2015) ====
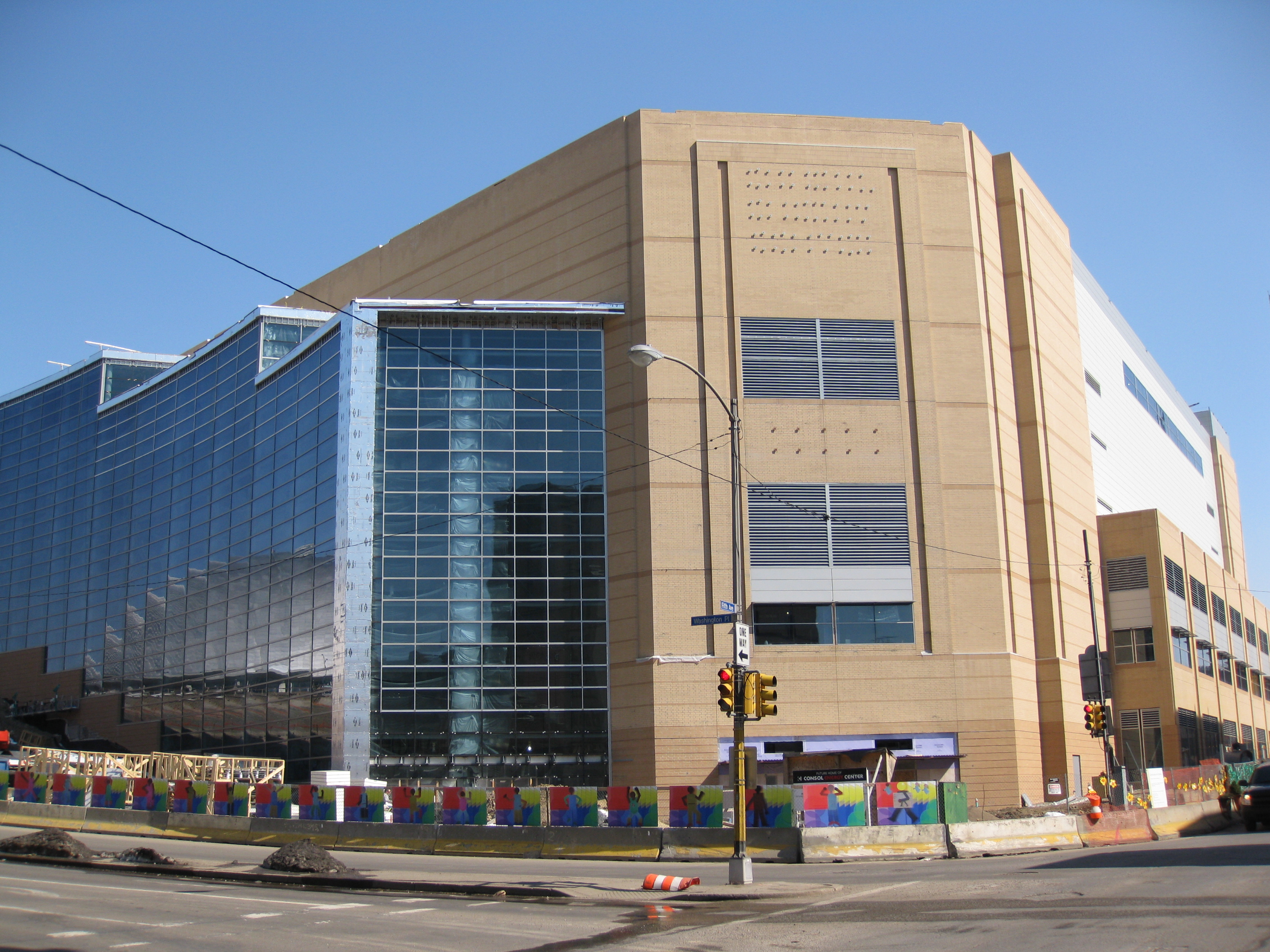
Outside of Consol Energy Center (now PPG Paints Arena) in March 2010 before it officially opened.

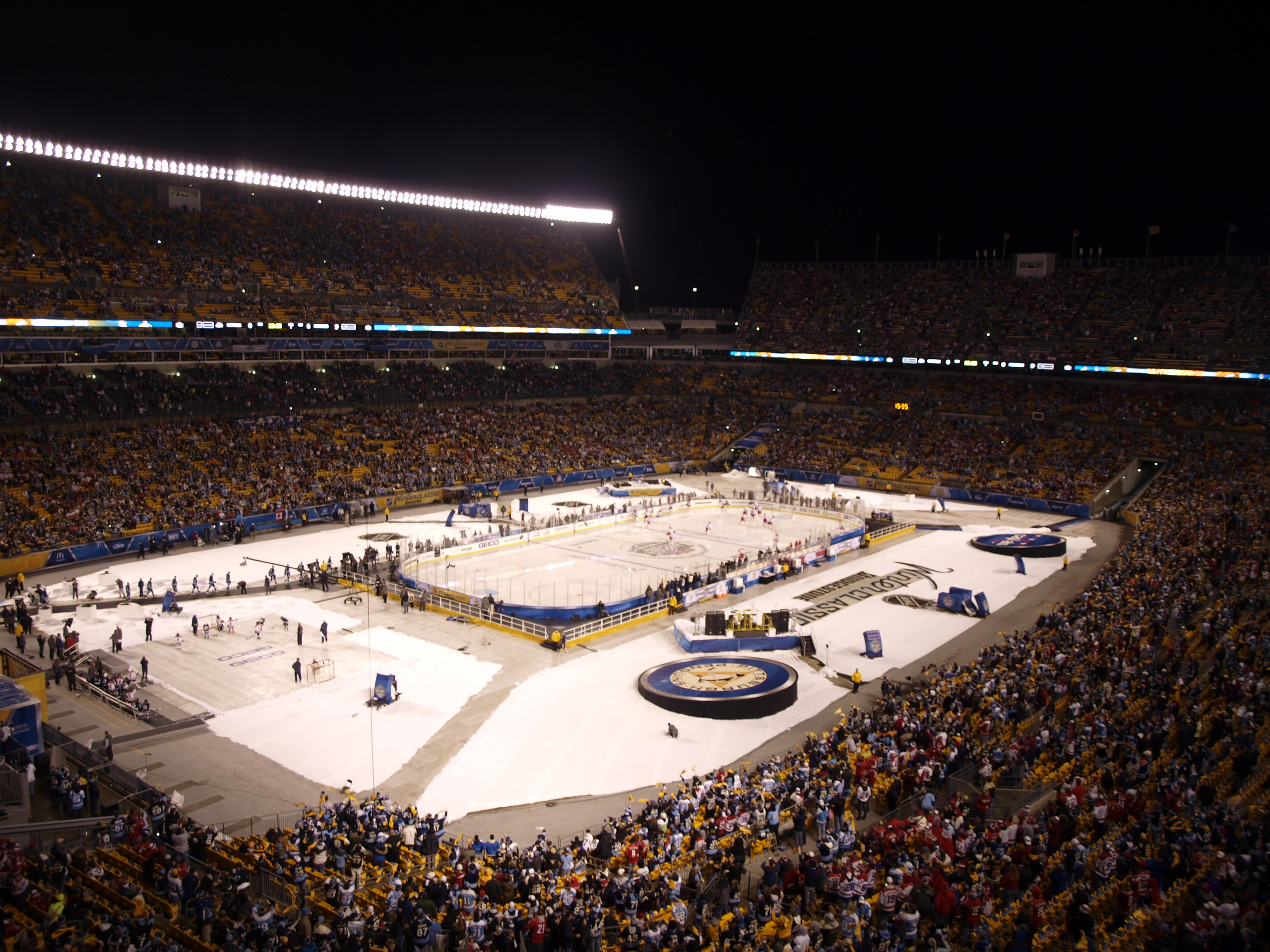
The Penguins hosted the Washington Capitals at Heinz Field during the 2011 Winter Classic.

In 2010–11, the Penguins played their first game in Consol Energy Center. On February 11, 2011, the Pittsburgh Penguins–New York Islanders brawl took place. A season-ending concussion suffered by Crosby and a knee injury to Malkin marred the season. The team left early in the playoffs, blowing a 3–1 series lead to Tampa Bay Lightning, with Fleury's goaltending called into question. With Crosby still sidelined with post-concussion syndrome, at the start of the 2011–12 season, Malkin led the Penguins' top line and dominated league scoring. He finished with 50 goals and 109 points as the Penguins earned 51 wins on the season. With Malkin's Art Ross-winning performance, and Crosby's late-season return from injury, the Penguins headed into the 2012 playoffs with high hopes of making a significant Stanley Cup run. However, their cross-state rivals, the Philadelphia Flyers, defeated the highly favored Penguins in six games. Malkin was later awarded the Hart Memorial Trophy and Lester B. Pearson award. Following the Penguins' disappointing playoff exit, general manager Ray Shero made changes to the team at the 2012 NHL entry draft for the upcoming 2012–13 season.

During the lockout-shortened 2012–13 season, the Penguins again fought through serious injury. At the end of the regular season, they finished atop the Eastern Conference, matching up against the New York Islanders in round one. The Penguins defeated the Islanders in six games, with Fleury struggling once again. The team then dispatched the Ottawa Senators in five games before being swept in the conference finals by the Boston Bruins, scoring just two goals in the entire four-game sweep. On June 13, 2013, Malkin signed an eight-year contract extension worth an annual average of $9.5 million.

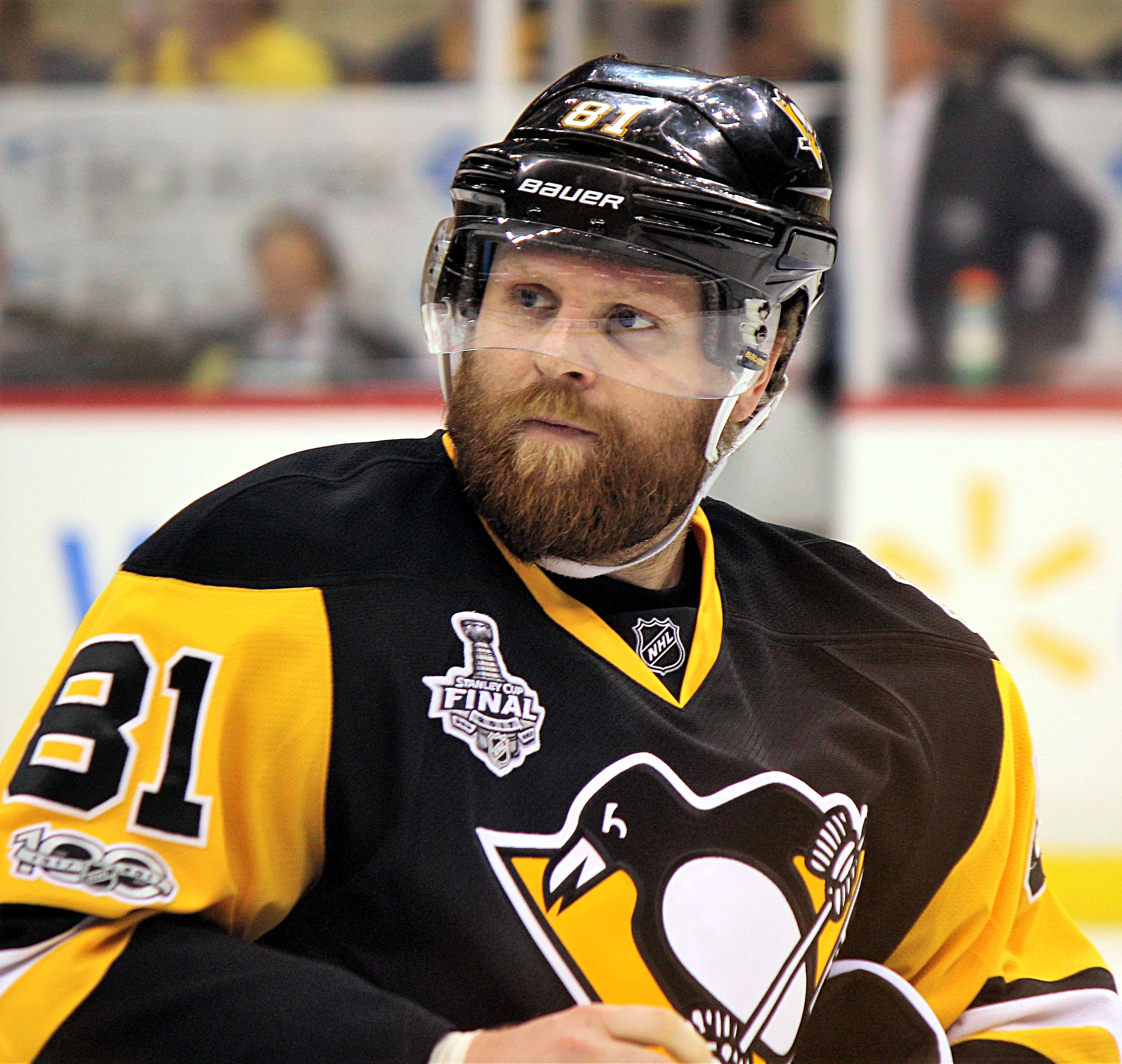
On July 1, 2015, the Penguins acquired right-winger Phil Kessel in a multi-player deal.

In the 2013–14 season, the Penguins suffered numerous injuries throughout the campaign. Despite the adversity, the Penguins won the realigned, eight-team Metropolitan Division, though the club struggled in the playoffs, requiring six games to defeat the Columbus Blue Jackets, then losing to the New York Rangers in seven games despite leading the series 3–1 after four games. This collapse prompted Penguins ownership to fire general manager Shero, replacing him on June 6 with Jim Rutherford, the former general manager of the Carolina Hurricanes. Rutherford's first action as general manager was to fire head coach Dan Bylsma, and on June 25, he announced that Mike Johnston was hired as Bylsma's replacement. In the 2014–15 season, the Penguins led the Metropolitan Division for the first half of the season. However, after losing players to injuries and illnesses, including the mumps, the team fell to fourth in the division. The Penguins lost in five games to the New York Rangers in the first round of the playoffs. In the off-season, Rutherford traded several players and picks to acquire star winger Phil Kessel.

==== Back-to-back Stanley Cups and 50th anniversary (2015–2017) ====
After acquiring Kessel, the Penguins had high expectations for the 2015–16 season. However, by December 12, 2015, the team was barely managing a winning season, posting a 15–10–3 record. The organization fired head coach Mike Johnston, and replaced him with Mike Sullivan, who had previously served as the head coach in Wilkes-Barre/Scranton. This move was followed by a series of trades by Jim Rutherford.

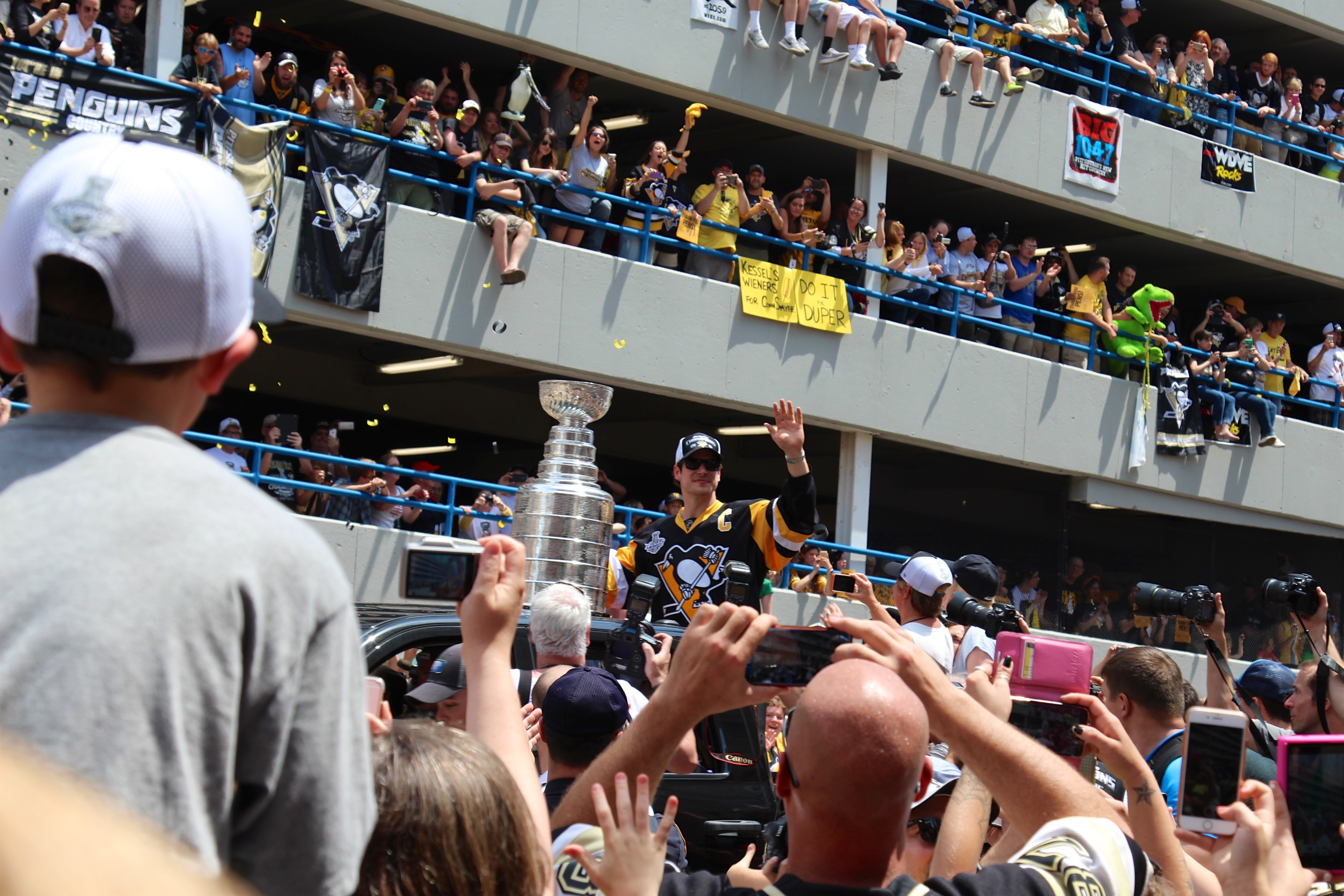
Crosby with the Stanley Cup during the Penguins' victory parade. The team won their fourth Stanley Cup championship in 2016.

The Penguins qualified for the playoffs for the tenth consecutive season. They earned second place in the Metropolitan Division with 104 points. In the playoffs, the Penguins defeated the Rangers in a 4–1 series, the Capitals 4–2 and the Lightning 4–3 to win the Eastern Conference championship, advancing to the Stanley Cup Final against the San Jose Sharks. On June 12, 2016, the Penguins defeated the Sharks in a 4–2 series to win their fourth Stanley Cup title. Captain Sidney Crosby was awarded the Conn Smythe Trophy.

The Penguins opened their 50th anniversary season in the NHL as defending Stanley Cup champions, raising their commemorative banner on October 13, 2016, in a shootout victory over Washington. The Penguins faced the Columbus Blue Jackets in the opening round of the 2017 playoffs, defeating them in five games. In the second round, they played against their divisional rival, Washington, and faced them for the second-straight year in the same round, winning a seven-game series. In the conference finals, the Penguins eliminated the Ottawa Senators in seven games to advance to the Stanley Cup Final, where they faced the Nashville Predators. The Penguins won the first two games of the series and then lost the next two matchups before dominating the fifth and the sixth games of the series to win the Stanley Cup for the second straight year. By defending their title, the Penguins became the first team since the 1997–98 Detroit Red Wings to defend their title and the first to do so in the salary cap era.

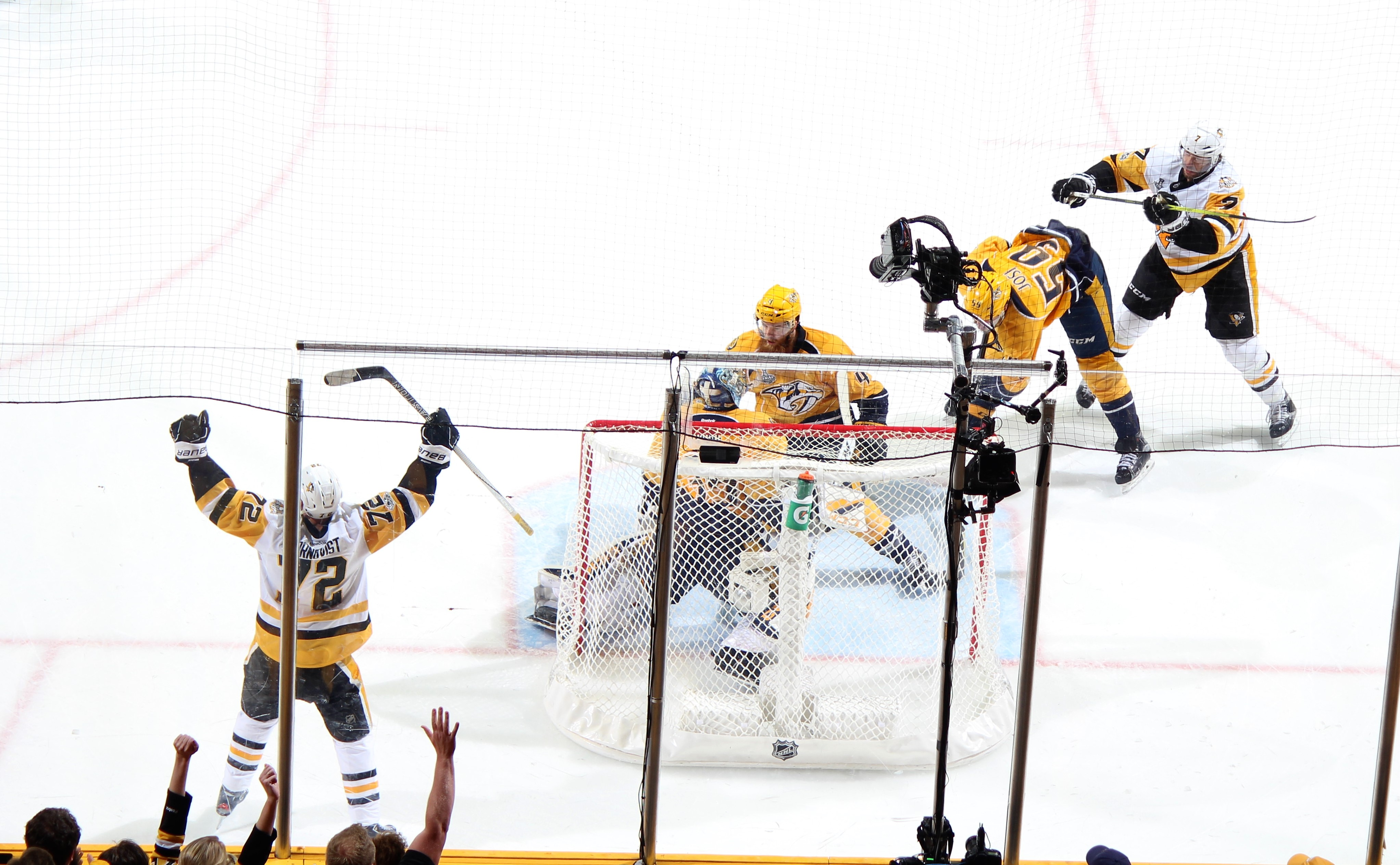
Patric Hornqvist celebrates the 2017 Stanley Cup-clinching goal against the Nashville Predators.

==== Continuing playoff streak (2017–2023) ====
Before the 2017–18 season, the Penguins lost longtime goaltender Marc-Andre Fleury in the 2017 NHL expansion draft to the Vegas Golden Knights. Nevertheless, the Penguins again qualified for the Stanley Cup playoffs with the second division playoff spot, finishing the regular season with 100 points. They defeated the Philadelphia Flyers in the first round in six games, but were defeated by the eventual Stanley Cup champion Washington Capitals in six games. In the next season, the Penguins clinched a playoff berth, but were swept by the New York Islanders in the first round. In the following season, which was shortened by the COVID-19 pandemic, the team advanced to the 2020 playoffs, but were defeated by the Montreal Canadiens in the qualifying round. On February 9, 2021, the Penguins named Ron Hextall as their new general manager, after Jim Rutherford resigned from his post on January 27, because of personal reasons. Brian Burke was hired as president of hockey operations. On February 21, Crosby became the first player to reach 1,000 NHL games for the team. The Penguins won the East Division title, extending their playoff streak to 15 seasons. This became the longest active streak in North American sports as a result of the San Antonio Spurs missing the 2020 NBA playoffs. The 2020–21 season came to an end in game 6 of the first round of the 2021 playoffs against the New York Islanders.

On November 29, 2021, Fenway Sports Group announced its intent to purchase a controlling stake in the Penguins. On December 31, 2021, they officially took over as majority owners of the Penguins. In the first round of the 2022 Stanley Cup playoffs, the Penguins lost in seven games to the New York Rangers despite having a 3–1 series lead. The game 7 loss marked the first time the Penguins lost a game 7 on the road in franchise history after going 6–0 the previous six instances.

The 2022–23 season was marked with two milestones for the Penguins. On November 23, 2022, Evgeni Malkin played his 1,000th NHL game, becoming the second player in franchise history to play his 1,000th game in a Penguins uniform. This would be followed up only months later, when teammate Kris Letang would play his 1,000th game as well, on April 2, 2023, despite missing 18 games during the season. However, despite being in a playoff position midway in the season, the Penguins missed the playoffs for the first time since Crosby's rookie season in 2005–06, ending a 16-season playoff streak and resulting in dismissals of Burke and Hextall.

==== Dubas era and roster retool (2023–present) ====
On June 1, 2023, Kyle Dubas was named the team's new president of hockey operations. On August 6, the Penguins traded for Norris Trophy-winning defenseman Erik Karlsson in a three-team deal also involving the Montreal Canadiens. On February 18, 2024, the Penguins retired the no. 68 of franchise legend Jaromír Jágr in a pregame celebration, with Jágr becoming just the third Penguin to receive the honor. Meanwhile, the Penguins' fortunes were not improving that season as they had hoped; prior to the NHL trade deadline, the Penguins parted ways with longtime and fan favorite forward Jake Guentzel, trading him to the Carolina Hurricanes. Despite the trades, and a late season playoff push, the Penguins were eliminated from playoff contention for the second consecutive year on the penultimate night of the season when the Detroit Red Wings defeated the Montreal Canadiens in overtime while the Capitals defeated the Philadelphia Flyers, clinching the final spot as the second wild card.

On September 16, 2024, Sidney Crosby signed a two-year $17.4 million extension to remain with the Penguins. The 2024–25 season was marked with many milestones by the Penguins' longtime dynastic duo. On October 10, Malkin recorded his 800th career assist on a goal by Erik Karlsson in a 6–3 win over the Detroit Red Wings, becoming the 34th player in league history to reach the mark. Two days later, Malkin recorded his 1,300th NHL point with an assist on a goal by Rickard Rakell, becoming the 37th player in league history to reach the mark. On October 16, Malkin scored his 500th career goal in a 6–5 overtime win over the Buffalo Sabres, to become the 48th player in league history to reach the mark and 24th player to do so with one franchise. On November 23, Crosby scored his 600th NHL goal against the Utah Hockey Club, becoming the 21st player in league history and second player in Penguins history to achieve the feat. On April 6, 2025, the Penguins were eliminated from playoff contention for the third consecutive season following a 3–1 loss to the Chicago Blackhawks. This was the Penguins' first season finishing with a losing record since the 2005–06 season.

On April 28, head coach Sullivan and the Penguins agreed to mutual contract termination, concluding his 10-season tenure with the team. Sullivan went on to be hired as the head coach of the New York Rangers, while Rangers assistant coach Dan Muse subsequently became the Penguins' head coach on June 4, 2025.

Prior to the opening game of 2025–26 season, Crosby, Malkin, and Letang were recognized by the Penguins as the first trio of teammates to play 20 seasons together in the history of major North American sports. On December 22, 2025, Crosby became the franchise all-time points leader with 1,724 points, passing Mario Lemieux. Crosby would later climb to seventh on the all-time scoring list on April 4, 2026, after a two-point game against the Florida Panthers, passing Steve Yzerman. Under Muse's new youth driven philosophy, the team significantly overperformed preseason predictions, finishing second in the Metropolitan Division with a 41–25–16 record, and scoring the third-most goals in the league. The Penguins qualified for the 2026 Stanley Cup playoffs, their first postseason berth in four years. In the first round, they faced their interstate rival Philadelphia Flyers, and despite falling into a 3–0 series deficit, the Penguins would win the next two games, but their effort would ultimately fall short as they lost game 6 in overtime.

After years of speculation around league circles about another potential sale, it was announced in December 2025, that David Hoffman and his family would buy the franchise. The Hoffmans took full control of the franchise on June 23, 2026, prior to the 2026–27 season.

== Team information ==
=== Crest and sweater design ===
When the Penguins made their NHL debut in 1967, the team wore the colors dark blue, light blue and white. The uniforms had the word "Pittsburgh" written diagonally down the front of the sweater with three dark blue stripes around the sleeves and bottom. The logo featured a hockey-playing penguin in a scarf over an inverted triangle, symbolizing the Golden Triangle of downtown Pittsburgh. A refined version of the logo appeared on a redesigned uniform in the second season, which removed the scarf and gave the penguin a sleeker look. The circle encompassing the logo was later removed. The team's colors were originally powder blue, navy blue, and white. The powder blue was changed to royal blue in 1973 but returned in 1977. The team adopted the current black and gold color scheme in 1980 to unify the colors of the city's professional sports teams although, like the Pittsburgh Pirates and the Steelers, the shade of gold more closely resembled yellow. The change was not without controversy, as the Boston Bruins protested by claiming to own the rights to the black and gold colors. However, the Penguins cited the colors worn by the now-defunct NHL team the Pittsburgh Pirates in the 1920s, as well as black and gold being the official colors of the City of Pittsburgh and its namesake, and obtained permission to use the black and gold colors. The NHL's Pittsburgh Pirates used old Pittsburgh Police uniforms, beginning the black and gold color tradition in the city.

The Penguins generally wore the black and gold "skating penguin" uniform between 1980 and 1992, with a few noticeable changes in the lettering and striping. A gold alternate uniform was worn between 1980 and 1984, and briefly replaced the white uniform for home games in the 1983–84 season.

In the 1992–93 season, the Penguins unveiled new uniforms and introduced the "flying penguin" logo, or "Robopenguin". The team's away uniforms were a throwback to the team's first season, as they revived the diagonal "Pittsburgh" script. In 1995, the team introduced their second alternate jersey, featuring different stripe designs on each sleeve. This jersey proved to be so popular that the team adopted it as their away jersey in 1997. In 2000, the Penguins brought back the "skating penguin" logo, but with a "Vegas gold" shade, upon releasing its new alternate uniform. After 2002, the "skating penguin" was readopted as the primary, though the "flying penguin" remained the alternate. A corresponding white version of the "Vegas gold" uniforms was introduced, and the 1995–2002 black uniform was retired. When the new jerseys were unveiled for the 2007–08 season league wide, the Penguins made major striping pattern changes and removed the "flying penguin" logo from the shoulders.

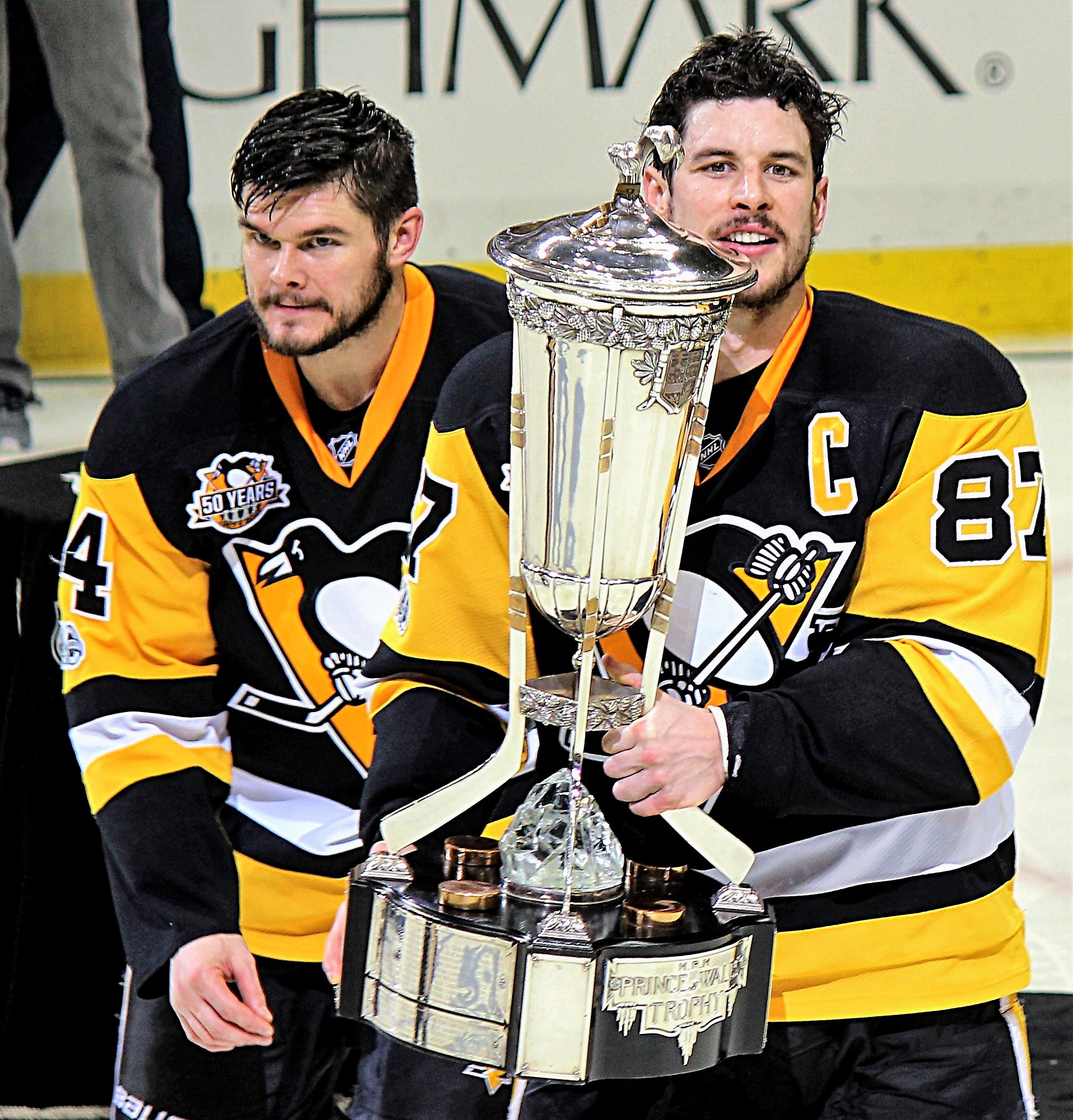
Throughout the 2016–17 season, a commemorative patch was added to the uniforms to celebrate the team's 50th anniversary.

The Penguins have worn their black jersey at home since the league began the initiative to do so beginning with the 2003–04 NHL season. The team wore their powder blue, 1968–1972 "throwbacks" against the Buffalo Sabres in the 2008 Winter Classic. This throwback was supposedly retired with the introduction of a new dark blue third jersey that made its debut at the 2011 Winter Classic. For the 2011–12 season, the 2011 Winter Classic jersey was the team's official third uniform, with the 2008 Winter Classic uniform having been retired. Called the "Blue Jerseys of Doom" by the Pittsburgh Tribune-Review, the alternate jerseys were worn when Sidney Crosby sustained a broken jaw and when he suffered a concussion in the 2011 Winter Classic. Evgeni Malkin was also concussed during a game when the Penguins donned the alternate uniforms.

In 2014, the Penguins released their new alternate uniforms. The new black uniforms are throwbacks to the early part of Lemieux's playing career, emulating the uniforms worn by the Penguins' 1991 and 1992 Cup-winning teams. The new alternate uniform featured "Pittsburgh gold", the particular shade of gold which had been retired when the Penguins switched to the metallic gold full-time in 2002. The Penguins eventually brought back a white version of the black "Pittsburgh gold" alternates, thus retiring the "Vegas gold" uniforms they wore from 2000 to 2016. A commemorative patch was added to the uniforms throughout the 2016–17 season to celebrate the team's 50th anniversary. During the 2017 Stadium Series against the archrival Philadelphia Flyers, the Penguins wore a special gold uniform featuring military-inspired lettering, a "City of Champions" patch and a variation of the "skating penguin" logo. This design served as the basis for the team's third uniform, which was unveiled in the 2018–19 season and was also partly inspired by the early 1980s gold uniforms. The Penguins wore monochrome black uniforms minus the white elements when they faced the Flyers again in the 2019 Stadium Series.

In 2021, the Penguins wore white "Reverse Retro" uniforms based on the 1992–97 uniforms. This set replaced the "flying penguin" with the alternate "skating penguin" logo minus the gold triangle on the shoulders. A black version served as the replacement for the gold alternate uniforms starting in the 2021–22 season. In the 2022–23 season, the Penguins unveiled their second "Reverse Retro" uniform, this time featuring a black version of the white "flying penguin" uniform they wore from 1992 to 2002.

For the 2023 Winter Classic, the Penguins went with a vintage white uniform with black stripes, and added a gold "P" logo as a nod to the NHL Pirates of the late 1920s.

On their home opener of the 2025–26 season, the Penguins donned a new alternate uniform, returning to a gold base with the "skating penguin" minus the triangle and a bottom black stripe. The three black stripes on the sleeves represent the "Three Rivers" of Pittsburgh: the Allegheny River, the Monongahela River, and the Ohio River. The "Three Rivers" symbolism was also carried over into the black triangle shoulder patch, which contained three gold waves and an igloo as a nod to Civic Arena. Letters and number fonts were based on Pittsburgh's historic trolley system.

During the 2026–27 season, the Penguins unveiled a "Hometown Remix" uniform, featuring a navy blue base with powder blue and gold accents as a nod to the 1960s pop art movement. Shoulder patches paid tribute to the Civic Arena and Pittsburgh's "Three Rivers".

=== Arenas ===
The Penguins called Civic Arena home for over 45 seasons from their inception in 1967. In September 2010, they completed the move to Consol Energy Center (now named PPG Paints Arena). The Penguins also played two "home" games in the Cleveland suburb of Richfield, Ohio, in 1992 and 1993 at the Richfield Coliseum (this is not unlike the Cleveland Cavaliers of the NBA playing an annual pre-season game in Pittsburgh; the Philadelphia 76ers used the Civic Arena as a second home in the early 1970s).

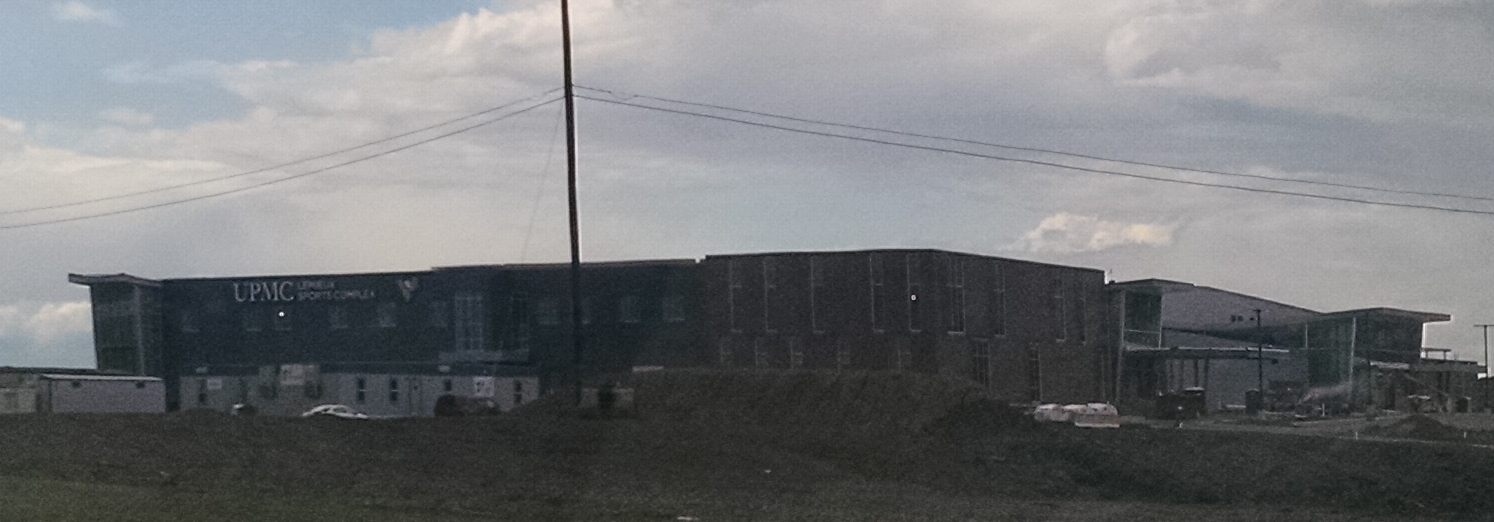
The UPMC Lemieux Sports Complex under construction in Cranberry Township, Pennsylvania, in April 2015. The complex opened in August 2015, and is used by the Penguins as their practice facility.

From 1995 to 2015, the IceoPlex at Southpointe in the South Hills suburbs served as the team's practice facility. Robert Morris University's 84 Lumber Arena has served as a secondary practice facility for the team. During the franchise's first pre-season training camp and pre-season exhibition games, the Brantford Civic Centre in Brantford, Ontario, served as its home, and by the 1970s and continuing through the 1980s, the team was using the suburban Rostraver Ice Garden for training.

In August 2015, the Penguins and the University of Pittsburgh Medical Center (UPMC) opened the UPMC Lemieux Sports Complex, combining a new team practice and training facility with a UPMC Sports Medicine treatment and research complex, in suburban Cranberry Township near the interchange between Interstate 79 and Pennsylvania Route 228. The twin rink facility replaced both the IceoPlex at Southpointe and the 84 Lumber Arena as the Penguins' regular practice facility, freeing up Consol Energy Center for other events on days the Penguins are not scheduled to play.

As with most other NHL arenas, the Penguins make use of a goal horn whenever the team scores a goal at home. It is also played just before the beginning of a home game, and after a Penguins victory. Their current goal horn made by Nathan Manufacturing, Inc. and introduced in 2005 to coincide with Sidney Crosby joining the team, was used at both the Civic Arena and Consol Energy Center.

=== Minor league affiliates ===
The Penguins have two minor league affiliates assigned to their team. The Wilkes-Barre/Scranton Penguins, their AHL affiliate, have played in Wilkes-Barre Township, Pennsylvania, since 1999. The Penguins also have a secondary affiliate in the ECHL, the Florida Everblades, which they have been associated with since the start of the 2026–27 ECHL season after 29 years affiliated with the Wheeling Nailers.

=== Fanbase ===
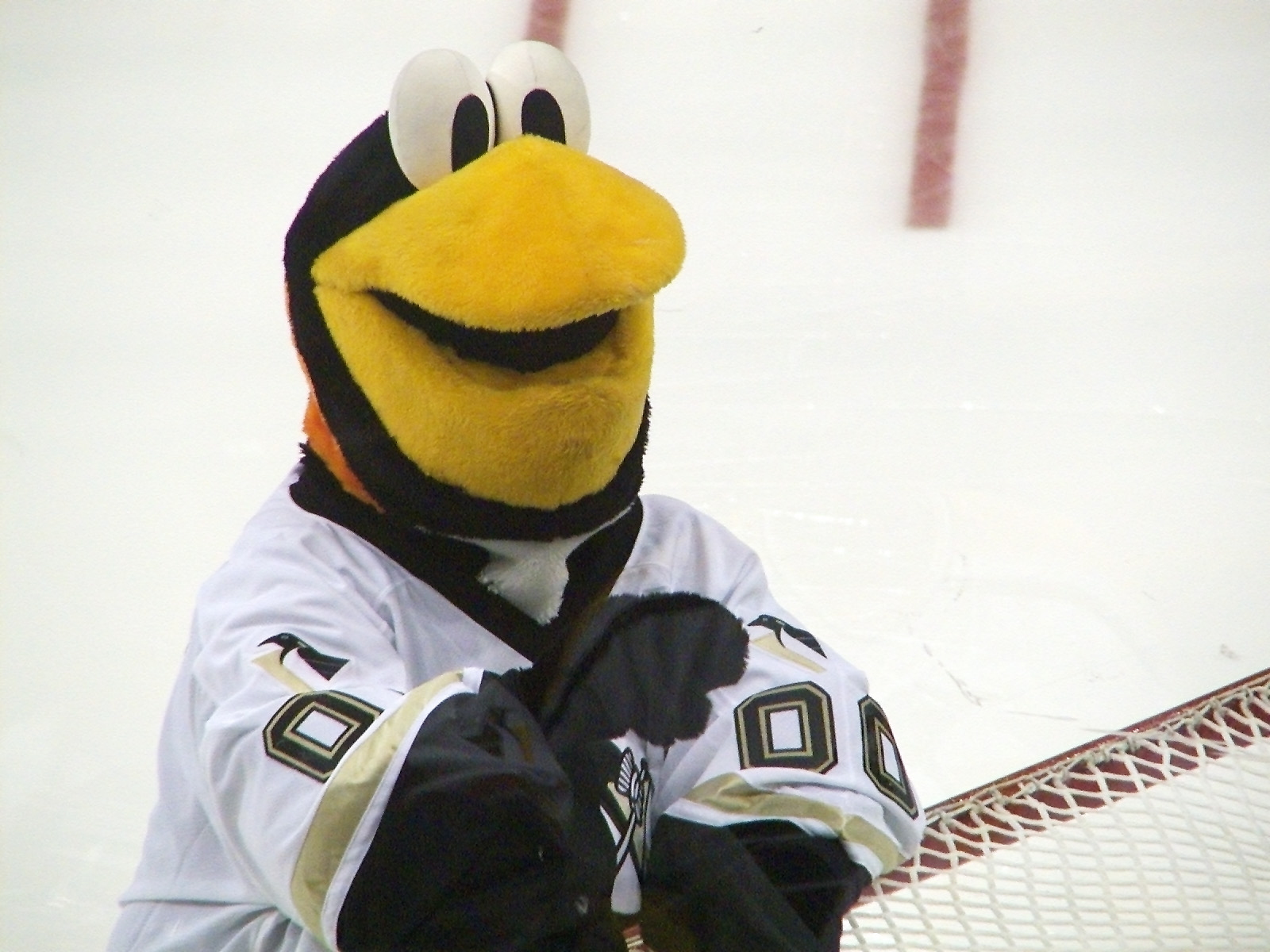
Iceburgh, the mascot of the Pittsburgh Penguins

Despite Pittsburgh's long history with hockey and a small but loyal fanbase, the Penguins struggled with fan support early on in its history, at times averaging only 6,000 fans per game when Civic Arena had a seating capacity of over 16,000. Fan support was so low by the team's first bankruptcy that the NHL had no problem with the team being moved, something that would change decades later when the team faced another relocation threat.

While the drafting of Mario Lemieux piqued interest in hockey locally, fans remained skeptical. John Steigerwald, brother of former Penguins broadcaster Paul Steigerwald, noted in his autobiography that upon his arrival at KDKA-TV from WTAE-TV in 1985, the station cared more about the Pittsburgh Spirit of the Major Indoor Soccer League than the Penguins. However, Lemieux's play steadily grew the fanbase in the area, which would only be reassured upon the arrival of Sidney Crosby after the team struggled both on the ice and in attendance following the Jaromír Jágr trade.

Today, the Penguins are one of the NHL's most popular teams, especially among American non-Original Six franchises, and are considered second behind the Steelers among Pittsburgh's three major professional sports teams, taking advantage of both its success and the Pittsburgh Pirates struggles both on and off the field. Especially notable was a 2007 survey done of the four major sports leagues' 122 teams. The Penguins surprised observers by being ranked 20th overall and third among NHL teams, while the Steelers were ranked number one and the Pirates (before the arrival of Andrew McCutchen and that team's turnaround) ranked much lower on the list than its peers. The Penguins' popularity has at times rivaled that of the Steelers at the local level.

=== In the community ===
The Pittsburgh Penguins Foundation conducts numerous community activities to support both youth and families through hockey education and charity assistance.

== Season-by-season record ==
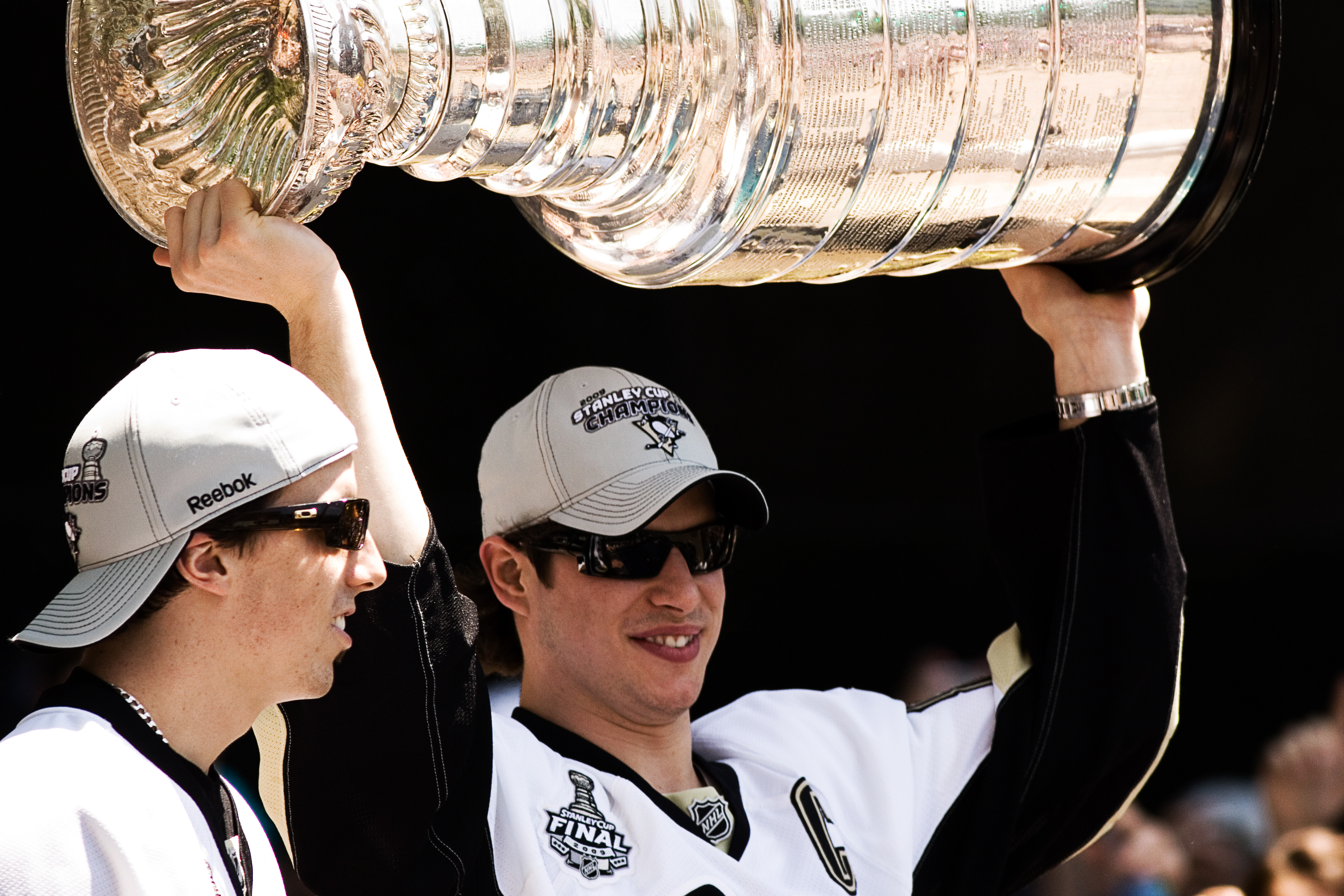
Sidney Crosby with Marc-André Fleury (left) and the Stanley Cup during the Penguins' victory parade in 2009.

This is a partial list of the last five seasons completed by the Penguins.

Note: GP = Games played, W = Wins, L = Losses, T = Ties, OTL = Overtime Losses, Pts = Points, GF = Goals for, GA = Goals against

Season	GP	W	L	OTL	Pts	GF	GA	Finish	Playoffs
2021–22	82	46	25	11	103	272	229	3rd, Metropolitan	Lost in first round, 3–4 (Rangers)
2022–23	82	40	31	11	91	262	264	5th, Metropolitan	Did not qualify
2023–24	82	38	32	12	88	255	251	5th, Metropolitan	Did not qualify
2024–25	82	34	36	12	80	243	293	7th, Metropolitan	Did not qualify
2025–26	82	41	25	16	98	293	268	2nd, Metropolitan	Lost in first round, 2–4 (Flyers)

== Players and personnel ==
=== Current roster ===
Updated November 1, 2026

No.	Nat	Player	Pos	S/G	Age	Acquired	Birthplace
16	(Canada)	Justin Brazeau	RW	R	28	2025	New Liskeard, Ontario
72	(United States)	Declan Carlile	D	L	26	2026	Flint, Michigan
59	(Russia)	Egor Chinakhov	RW	L	25	2025	Omsk, Russia
87	(Canada)	Sidney Crosby (C)	C	L	39	2005	Cole Harbour, Nova Scotia
19	(Canada)	Connor Dewar	LW/C	L	27	2025	The Pas, Manitoba
49	(Canada)	Sam Girard	D	L	28	2026	Roberval, Quebec
27	(Canada)	Ryan Graves	D	L	31	2023	Yarmouth, Nova Scotia
65	(Sweden)	Erik Karlsson	D	R	36	2023	Landsbro, Sweden
81	(Canada)	Ben Kindel	C	R	19	2025	Coquitlam, British Columbia
41	(Finland)	Ville Koivunen	RW	L	23	2024	Oulu, Finland
6	(Canada)	Kaedan Korczak	D	R	25	2026	Yorkton, Saskatchewan
62	(Russia)	Andrei Kuzmenko	RW	R	30	2026	Yakutsk, Russia
22	(Canada)	Hendrix Lapierre	C	L	24	2026	Gatineau, Quebec
58	(Canada)	Kris Letang (A)	D	R	39	2005	Montreal, Quebec
46	(United States)	Blake Lizotte	C	L	28	2024	Lindstrom, Minnesota
71	(Russia)	Evgeni Malkin (A)	C/LW	L	40	2004	Magnitogorsk, Soviet Union
1	(Russia)	Sergei Murashov	G	R	22	2022	Yaroslavl, Russia
18	(United States)	Tommy Novak	C/LW	L	29	2025	River Falls, Wisconsin
67	(Sweden)	Rickard Rakell	RW/C	R	33	2022	Sundbyberg, Sweden
14	(United States)	Nick Robertson	LW	L	25	2026	Arcadia, California
17	(United States)	Bryan Rust	RW	R	34	2010	Pontiac, Michigan
37	(Latvia)	Artūrs Šilovs	G	L	25	2025	Riga, Latvia
25	(Sweden)	Elmer Söderblom	LW	L	25	2026	Gothenburg, Sweden
7	(Belarus)	Ilya Solovyov	D	L	26	2026	Mogilev, Belarus
24	(United States)	Spencer Stastney	D	L	26	2026	Mequon, Wisconsin
57	(United States)	Trevor van Riemsdyk	D	R	35	2026	Middletown, New Jersey

=== Honored members ===
==== Retired numbers ====
The banners of numbers retired by the Penguins franchise (pictured prior to the retirement of Jaromír Jágr's jersey) hang in the rafters of PPG Paints Arena; prior to the Jágr ceremony, the banners were replaced with new ones that had Lemieux with gold numbers on a black background while Briere was given a blue background.

Pittsburgh Penguins retired numbers
No.	Player	Position	Career	Date Of Retirement
21	Michel Brière	C	1969–1970	January 5, 2001 (Note: Taken out of circulation following Briere's death (1971), but not officially retired until January 5, 2001.)
66	Mario Lemieux	C	1984–1997; 2000–2006	November 19, 1997 (Note: Lemieux's number was restored when he resumed playing for the team on December 27, 2000, and once again retired on October 5, 2006.)
68	Jaromír Jágr	RW	1990–2001	February 18, 2024

The NHL retired Wayne Gretzky's No. 99 for all its member teams at the 2000 NHL All-Star Game.

==== Hockey Hall of Fame ====
The Pittsburgh Penguins presently acknowledge an affiliation with a number of inductees to the Hockey Hall of Fame. Inductees affiliated with the Penguins include 15 former players and five builders of the sport. (Note: The Penguins also recognize an affiliation with Hall of Famer Red Kelly, who served as the Penguins' head coach from 1969 to 1973. However, he was inducted into the Hockey Hall of Fame in the players' category in 1969, not its builder category, and had never played for the Penguins. However, the team continues to acknowledge an affiliation as a Penguins Hall of Famer.) The four individuals recognized as builders by the Hockey Hall of Fame includes former head coaches, and general managers.

In addition to builders and players, broadcasters and sports journalists have also been recognized by the Hockey Hall of Fame, however are not inductees. In 2001, radio play-by-play broadcaster Mike Lange, was awarded the Foster Hewitt Memorial Award from the Hall of Fame. In 2009, Dave Molinari, a sports journalist for the Pittsburgh Post-Gazette was awarded the Elmer Ferguson Memorial Award from the Hall of Fame.

Players

- Tom Barrasso
- Andy Bathgate
- Leo Boivin
- Paul Coffey
- Ron Francis
- Tim Horton
- Marián Hossa
- Jarome Iginla
- Mario Lemieux
- Joe Mullen
- Larry Murphy
- Mark Recchi
- Luc Robitaille
- Bryan Trottier
- Sergei Zubov

Builders

- Scotty Bowman
- Herb Brooks
- Bob Johnson
- Craig Patrick
- Jim Rutherford

==== Team captains ====
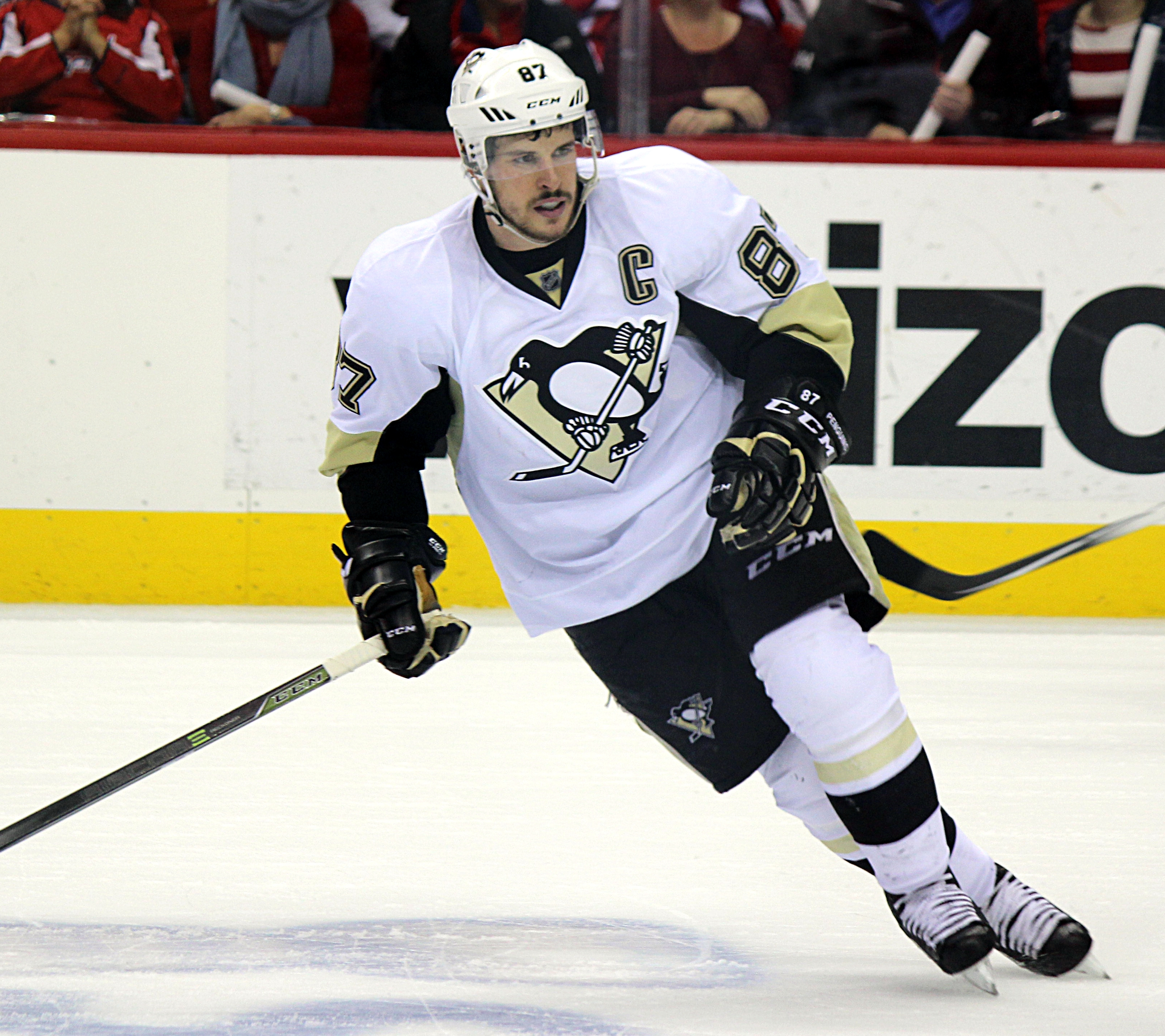
The team's current captain, Sidney Crosby, during a playoff game in 2016.

All the players who have served as team captain with the Penguins franchise

- Ab McDonald, 1967–1968
- Earl Ingarfield, 1968–1969
- Ron Schock, 1973–1977
- Jean Pronovost, 1977–1978
- Orest Kindrachuk, 1978–1981
- Randy Carlyle, 1981–1984
- Mike Bullard, 1984–1986
- Terry Ruskowski, 1986–1987
- Dan Frawley, 1987
- Mario Lemieux, 1987–1994, 1995–1997, 2001–2006
- Ron Francis, 1995, 1997–1998
- Jaromír Jágr, 1998–2001
- Sidney Crosby, 2007–present

=== Penguins Hall of Fame ===
The Penguins originally established a team Hall of Fame in 1992 and inducted players on an intermittent basis until 2013. In 2025, the team announced the re-launch of the team Hall of Fame and announced the induction of ten people that will have their ceremonies occur in the next three years: Scotty Bowman, Ron Francis, Eddie Johnston, and Kevin Stevens were inducted as the Class of 2025 while Tom Barrasso, Jaromír Jágr, Chris Kunitz, Larry Murphy, Jim Rutherford, and Ray Shero will be inducted sometime in 2026 and 2027.

Players

- Syl Apps Jr.
- Les Binkley
- Dave Burrows
- Paul Coffey
- Rick Kehoe
- Mario Lemieux
- Joe Mullen
- Jean Pronovost
- Mark Recchi
- Ulf Samuelsson

Builders

- Bob Johnson
- Craig Patrick
- Jack Riley

Contributors

- Dr. Charles Burke
- A.T. Caggiano
- Edward J. DeBartolo Sr.
- Elaine Heufelder
- Mike Lange
- Vince Lascheid
- Frank Scuilli

== Franchise records ==
=== Scoring leaders ===
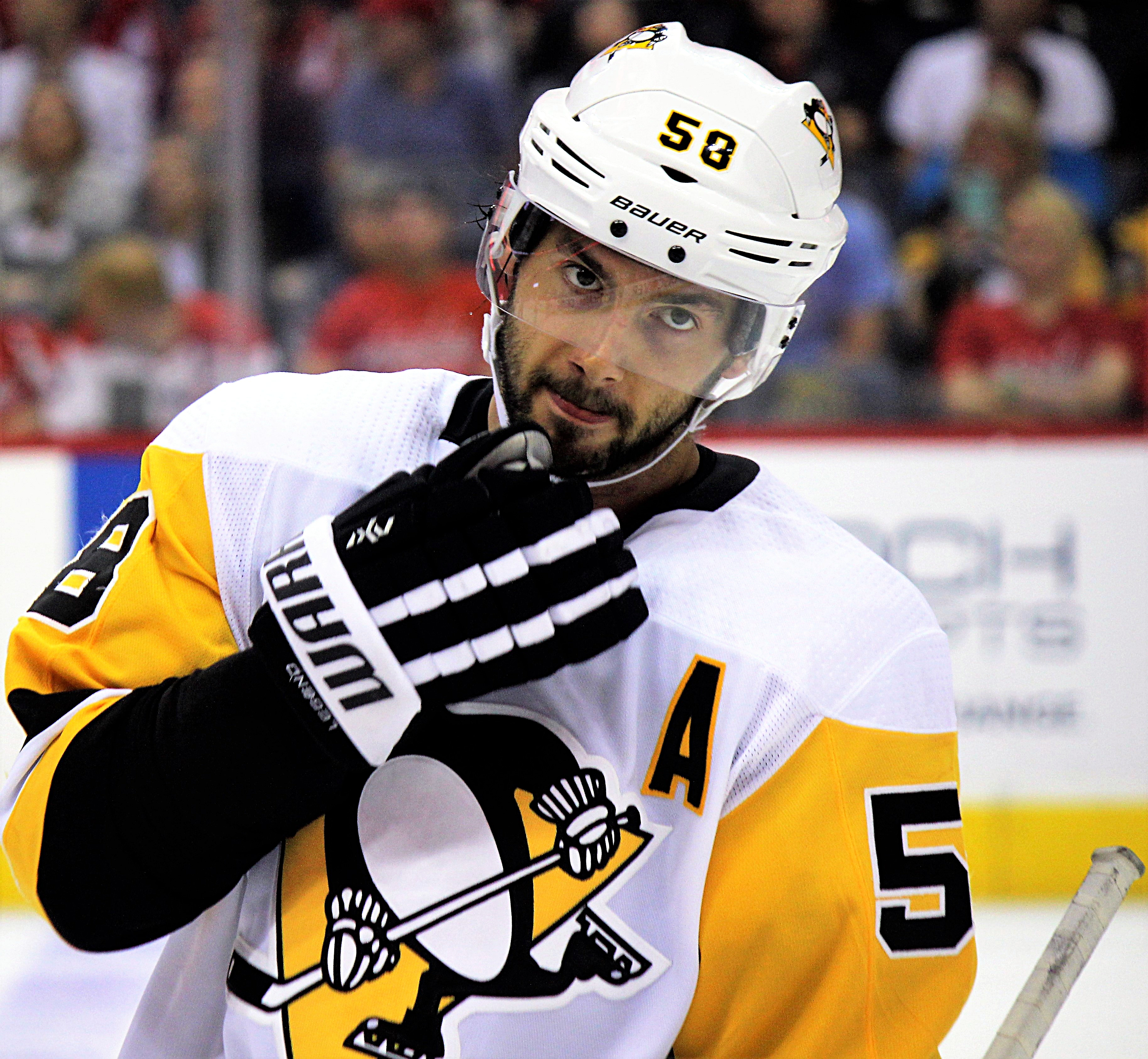
Kris Letang holds the franchise's all-time points record for a defenseman.

These are the top-ten point-scorers in franchise history. Figures are updated after each completed NHL regular season.

- * – current Penguins player

Note: Pos = Position; GP = Games played; G = Goals; A = Assists; Pts = Points; P/G = Points per game

Points
Player	Pos	GP	G	A	Pts	P/G
Sidney Crosby*	C	1,420	654	1,107	1,761	1.24
Mario Lemieux	C	915	690	1,033	1,723	1.88
Evgeni Malkin*	C	1,269	533	874	1,407	1.11
Jaromír Jágr	RW	806	439	640	1,079	1.34
Kris Letang*	D	1,235	178	628	806	.65
Rick Kehoe	RW	722	312	324	636	.88
Ron Francis	C	533	164	449	613	1.15
Jean Pronovost	RW	753	316	287	603	.80
Kevin Stevens	LW	522	260	295	555	1.06
Bryan Rust*	RW	710	232	270	502	.71

Goals
Player	Pos	G
Mario Lemieux	C	690
Sidney Crosby*	C	654
Evgeni Malkin*	C	533
Jaromír Jágr	RW	439
Jean Pronovost	RW	316
Rick Kehoe	RW	312
Kevin Stevens	LW	260
Bryan Rust*	RW	232
Jake Guentzel	LW	219
Mike Bullard	C	185

Assists
Player	Pos	A
Sidney Crosby*	C	1,107
Mario Lemieux	C	1,033
Evgeni Malkin*	C	874
Jaromír Jágr	RW	640
Kris Letang*	D	628
Ron Francis	C	449
Syl Apps Jr.	C	349
Paul Coffey	D	332
Rick Kehoe	RW	324
Kevin Stevens	LW	295

=== Goaltending leaders ===
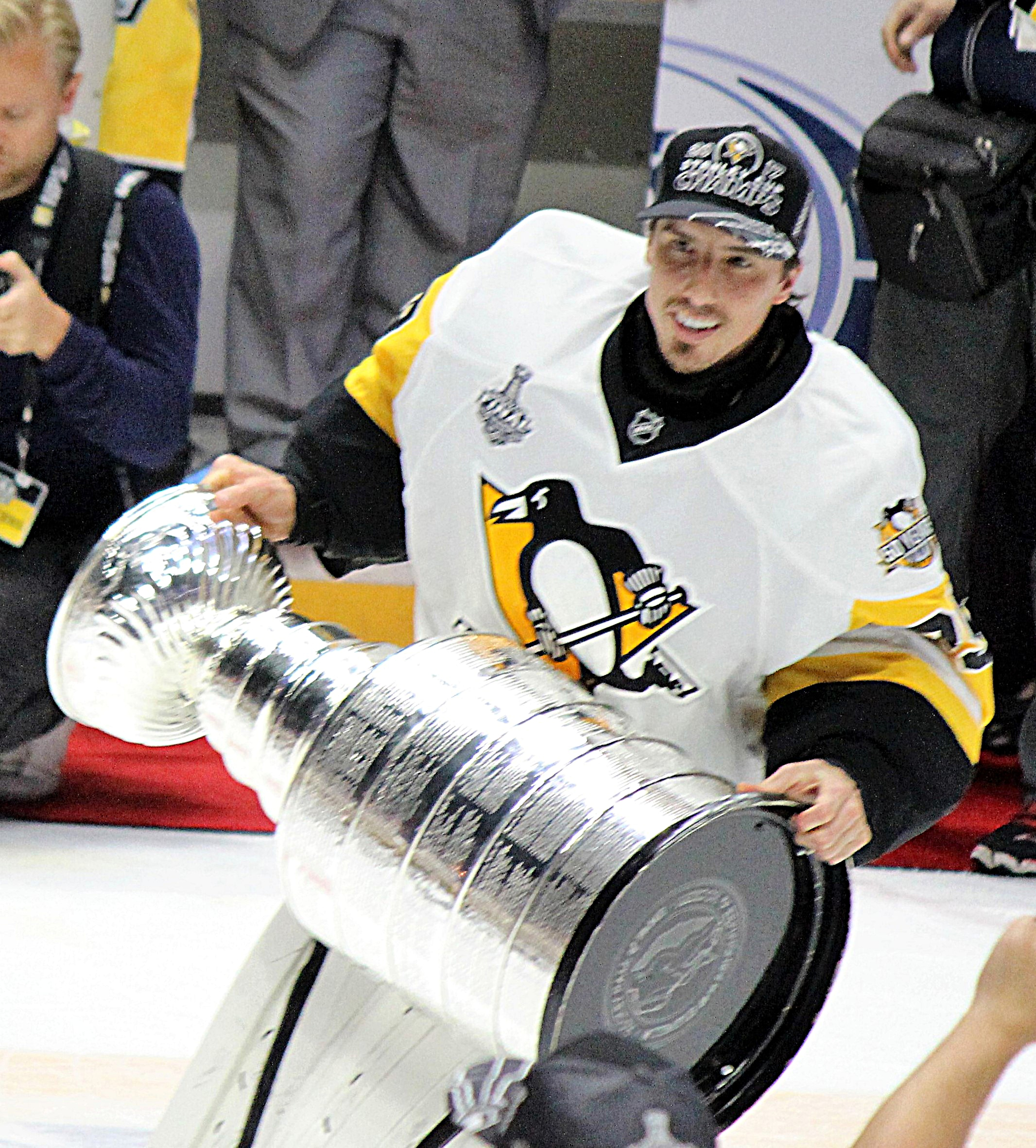
Marc-André Fleury is franchise's all-time leader in wins and games played among goaltenders.

These are the top-ten goaltenders in franchise history by wins. Figures are updated after each completed NHL regular season.

- * – current Penguins player

Note: GP = Games played; W = Wins; L = Losses; T/O = Ties/Overtime losses; GA = Goal against; GAA = Goals against average; SA = Shots against; SV% = Save percentage; SO = Shutouts

Goaltenders
Player	GP	W	L	T/O	GA	GAA	SA	SV%	SO
Marc-André Fleury	691	375	216	68	1,713	2.58	19,487	.912	44
Tom Barrasso	460	226	153	53	1,409	3.27	13,479	.895	22
Tristan Jarry	307	161	100	32	791	2.74	8,719	.909	22
Matt Murray	199	117	53	19	505	2.67	5,877	.914	11
Ken Wregget	212	104	67	21	644	3.29	6,285	.898	6
Denis Herron	290	88	133	44	1,040	3.88	9,108	.886	6
Jean-Sébastien Aubin	168	63	72	11	432	2.92	4,369	.901	6
Les Binkley	196	58	94	34	574	3.12	5,612	.898	11
Casey DeSmith	134	58	44	15	340	2.81	3,870	.912	9
Gregory Millen	135	57	56	18	501	3.84	3,987	.874	4

== Rivalries ==
=== Philadelphia Flyers ===
Considered by some to be the best rivalry in the NHL, the Philadelphia Flyers–Pittsburgh Penguins rivalry began in 1967 when the teams were introduced in the NHL's "Next Six" expansion wave. The rivalry exists both due to divisional alignment and geographic location, as both teams play in Pennsylvania. The Flyers lead the head-to-head record with a 153–98–30 record. However, the Penguins eliminated the Flyers from the playoffs in 2008 and 2009 and were eliminated by them from the playoffs in 2012, strengthening the rivalry. Three years later, the Flyers won the sixth playoff meeting between the clubs to advance to the conference semifinals.

The franchises have met seven times in the playoffs, with the Flyers winning four series (1989 division finals, 4–3; 1997 conference quarterfinals, 4–1; 2000 conference semifinals, 4–2; and 2012 conference quarterfinals, 4–2) and the Penguins winning three (2008 conference finals, 4–1; 2009 conference quarterfinals, 4–2; and 2018 first round, 4–2).

=== Washington Capitals ===
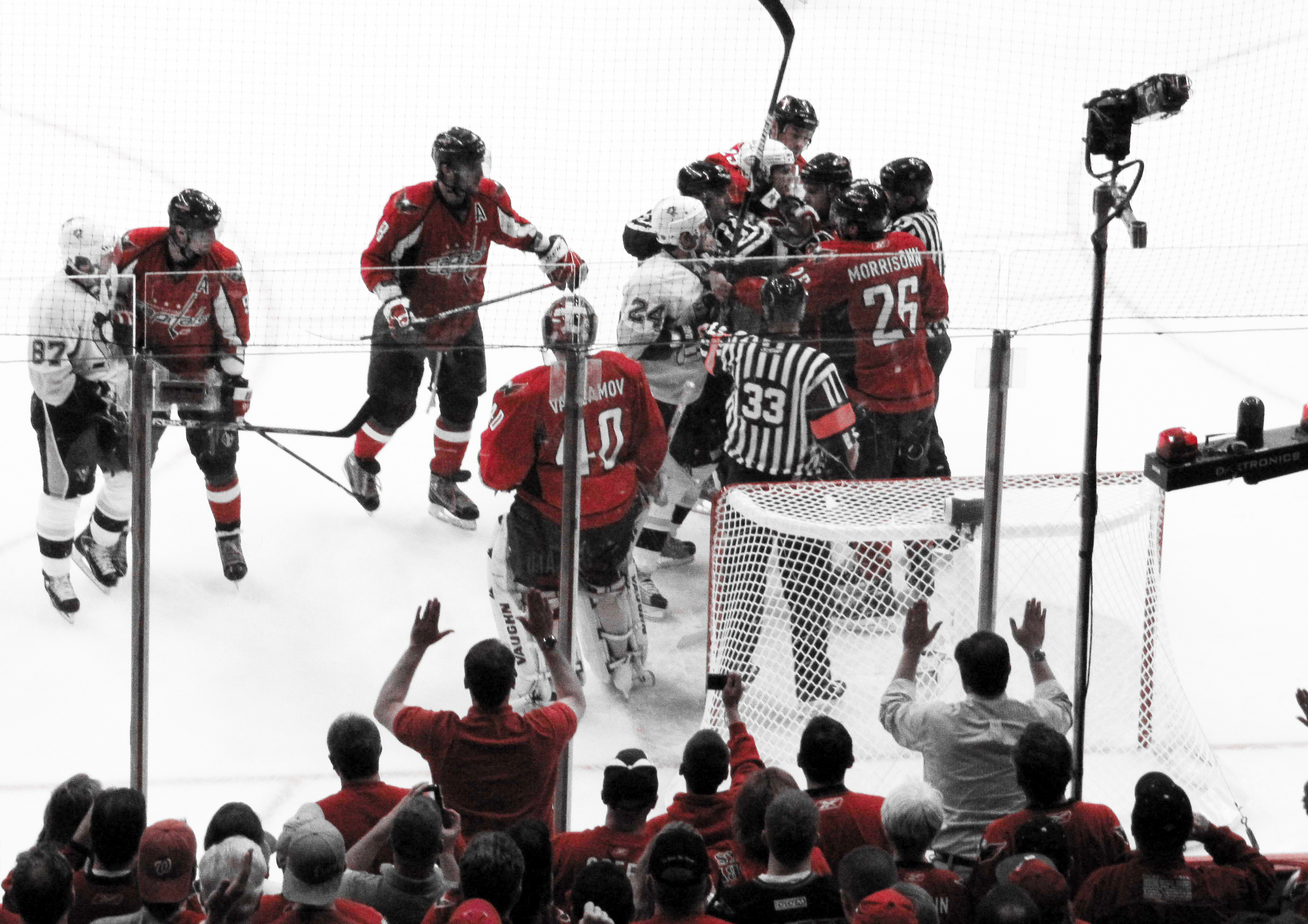
An altercation between the Penguins and the Washington Capitals during the 2009 playoffs.

The two teams have faced off 11 times in the playoffs, with the Penguins winning nine of the 11 matchups, their two series losses coming in the 1994 and 2018 playoffs. The Penguins defeated the Capitals en route to their five Stanley Cup victories. They have met in a decisive game 7 in the 1992, 1995, 2009 and 2017 playoffs. The NHL's fourth Winter Classic, played on January 1, 2011, at Heinz Field in Pittsburgh showcased this rivalry. The Capitals won the game 3–1. The rivalry can also be seen in the American Hockey League (AHL). Pittsburgh's top farm team is the Wilkes-Barre/Scranton Penguins, and their in-state and biggest rivals are the Capitals' top farm team, the Hershey Bears.

== Media ==
=== Radio ===
The Penguins have their radio home on WXDX-FM and their television home on SportsNet Pittsburgh. The Pittsburgh Penguins Radio Network consists of a total of 34 stations in four states. Twenty three of these are in Pennsylvania, four in West Virginia, three in Ohio, and three in Maryland. The network also features an FM high-definition station in Pittsburgh.

=== Broadcasters ===
Local ABC affiliate WTAE-TV broadcast the Penguins during the 1967–68 season, with station Sports Director Ed Conway handling the play-by-play during both the television and radio broadcasts. He remained the lone play-by-play broadcaster until the completion of the 1968–69 season. Joe Tucker took over for Ed Conway during the 1969–70 season, when WPGH-TV and WTAE-TV split Penguins' broadcasts. WPGH-TV retained the rights to broadcast the Penguins for the 1970–71 season, with Bill Hamilton handing the play-by-play duties. The 1970–71 season was also the first season where the Penguins introduced a color commentator to the broadcast team, with John MacDonald taking the position in the booth.

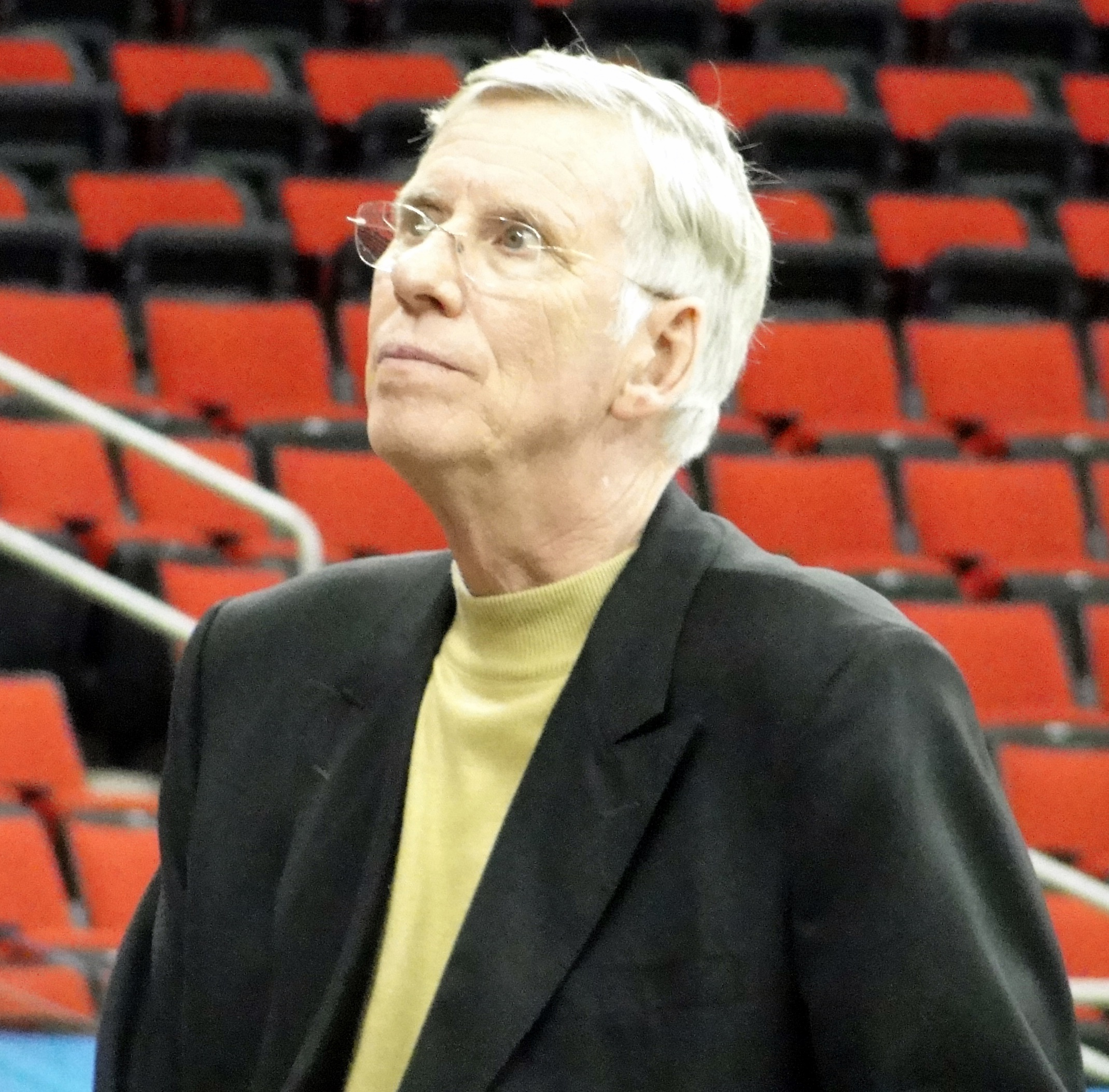
Mike Lange served as a play-by-play commentator for the team from 1974 until 2021.

Mike Lange, who joined the Penguins' broadcast team as a play-by-play announcer on the radio side in 1974–75 became the play-by-play broadcaster for the team at the start of the 1979–80 season. At his side was Terry Schiffauer, who had previously held the position of Penguins' director of public relations and eventually transitioned into color commentator for Sam Nover in 1972–73. Lange and Schiffauer remained a team in the Penguins' broadcast booth until 1984–85, when Schiffauer was replaced by Paul Steigerwald. Lange and Steigerwald remained a constant in the broadcast booth from 1985 until 1999. With Steigerwald's departure in 1999, Mike Lange shared the broadcast booth with former Penguins' defenseman Peter Taglianetti. Taglianetti remained in the position for one season before being replaced by Eddie Olczyk. Lange and Olczyk were broadcast partners from 2000 until 2003, when Olczyk left the booth to become the 18th head coach in Penguins' history following the firing of previous head coach Rick Kehoe after the 2002–03 season. With Olczyk's vacancy, the Penguins hired Bob Errey as their new color commentator for the start of the 2003–04 season. Lange and Errey remained in the booth until 2005–06. After 26 seasons in the television broadcast booth, FSN Pittsburgh did not retain Mike Lange. Instead, he was replaced by former broadcast partner Paul Steigerwald, who remained the team's TV play-by-play broadcaster until the 2016–17 season. Lange returned to the radio broadcast booth and holds the position of radio play-by-play announcer, the same position he held with the team in the mid-1970s. Following the 2016–17 season, Steigerwald moved back to the Penguins front office and NHL Network personality Steve Mears was hired as the new television play-by-play announcer starting with the 2017–18 season. Lange retired in the 2021 off-season, with Josh Getzoff being named as his replacement. Phil Bourque serves as the radio color commentator. Before the 2023–24 season, Getzoff moved to the television booth with Mears replacing him on the radio. The Penguins did not retain TV analyst Bob Errey, choosing to go with a rotation of analysts featuring former Penguins Colby Armstrong, Mike Rupp and Phil Bourque. In 2024, Joe Brand replaced Steve Mears on the radio booth after Mears was hired by the Blue Jackets.

Every Penguins game is carried on the AT&T SportsNet Pittsburgh network, which is carried by cable providers in most of two states and parts of four others. On October 2, 2023, the network will be purchased by the Penguins and rebranded to SportsNet Pittsburgh. In addition, Fox Sports Ohio simulcasts Penguins hockey in the Cleveland metro area, as well as some parts of Eastern Ohio and Northern Kentucky. Dish Network, Verizon FiOS, and Direct TV each carry the Penguins games on their AT&T SportsNet Pittsburgh channel in HD nationally. The Pittsburgh Penguins also receive monthly and sometimes weekly "game of the week" national exposure on American networks ESPN, ESPN+, ABC, and TNT, and Canadian networks Sportsnet and CBC. Previously, the Penguins received national TV exposure on Fox, NBC and NBCSN in the U.S., and TSN in Canada.

=== In-game announcers ===
Ryan Mill has been the Penguins' public address announcer since 2009 when he succeeded John Barbero. Jeff Jimerson has been the team's official anthem singer since 1991 and also served in the same capacity in the Jean-Claude Van Damme movie Sudden Death.

== Notes ==
Preceded by Edmonton Oilers	Stanley Cup champions 1990–91, 1991–92	Succeeded by Montreal Canadiens
Preceded by Detroit Red Wings	Stanley Cup champions 2008–09	Succeeded by Chicago Blackhawks
Preceded by Chicago Blackhawks	Stanley Cup champions 2015–16, 2016–17	Succeeded by Washington Capitals
