= Scramble style =

Goalie style in ice hockey

In ice hockey, the scramble style is a style that evolved from the play of Czech netminder Dominik Hašek, where a variety of non-traditional movements were used to make saves. This included falling down supine in the crease, which led to the moniker "scramble style". Scramble style relies more on agility and flexibility than positioning.

It is also known as "snow angeling" and has been referred to as an "unorthodox" style of goaltending. It's an extremely unpredictable and oftentimes uncontrol style of play. Goalies use this style of play that is considered a catch 22 of hockey - spectacular goals are often blocked but in the same feet, many goals are made the opposing team.
