= List of Pittsburgh Pirates broadcasters =

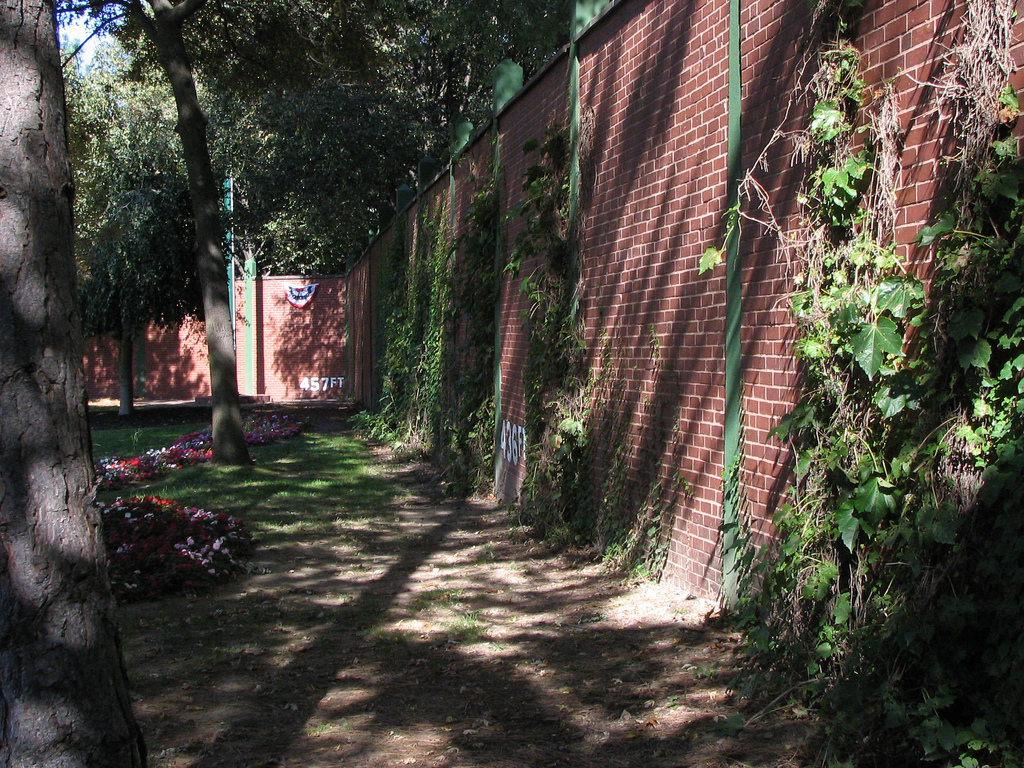
Forbes Field wall – 2006

The Pittsburgh Pirates are members of Major League Baseball (MLB); they have employed sportscasters to provide play-by-play and color commentary during games broadcast over the radio and on television.

On August 5, 1921, Pittsburgh hosted the first baseball game broadcast over the radio. Harold Arlin, a foreman at Westinghouse, announced the game over KDKA from a box seat next to the first base dugout at Forbes Field. Throughout the 1920s and 1930s "occasional" games would be broadcast, until Rosey Rowswell became the first "Voice of the Pirates" in 1936. While most of Roswell's early broadcasts were solo, he was joined by Pirates' co-owner Bing Crosby and his successor Bob Prince for games. Prince took over as lead broadcaster in 1955 and held the position over the next 20 seasons. Prince gained a reputation for giving players nicknames and inventing catchphrases to describe the game; he was inducted into the National Baseball Hall of Fame and Museum in August 1986. After the Pirates fired Bob Prince and his sidekick Nellie King after the 1975 season, they hired Milo Hamilton away from Atlanta to be the lead broadcaster and brought Lanny Frattare from their minor league affiliate to be the second announcer. After Hamilton left after the 1979 season, Frattare held the position for 29 years—the longest tenure of any Pirates' broadcaster. Upon Frattare's retirement after the 2008 season, Greg Brown took over the role as lead broadcaster. A number of people have held temporary positions as broadcasters, including former players Don Hoak, Dave Giusti, Willie Stargell, and Pittsburgh Penguins' broadcaster Mike Lange.

WWSW-FM broadcast Pirates' games on the radio during the 1940s and 1950s until KDKA became the franchise's flagship station in 1955. In 2006, the Pirates switched to WPGB in an attempt to reach younger age brackets; under the contract WPGB carried Pirates' games though the 2011 season. Starting with the 2012 season, KDKA-FM took over as the flagship station of the Pirates Radio Network. As of 2016, the Pirates Radio Network has stations located in Pennsylvania, West Virginia, Ohio and Maryland.

== TV & radio broadcasters ==
Go ball, get outta here!

— Lanny Frattare after a Pirates home run

There are a reported 15,000 people at the game this afternoon. If that's true, then at least 12,000 of them are disguised as empty seats.

— Jim Woods

There was nooooo doubt about it.

— Lanny Frattare after a Pirates win

Clear the deck, cannonball coming!

— Greg Brown after a Pirates home run

Raise the Jolly Roger!

— Greg Brown after a Pirates win

Broadcaster	Years^{[a]}	Reference
Harold Arlin	1921	
Jimmy Murray	1934	
Walter E. Sickles	1934	
Pat Patterson	1935	
Tony Wakeman	1936	
Regis Welsh	1936	
Jimmy Dudley	1937	
Claude Haring	1937; 1963–1964	
Rosey Rowswell	1938–1954	
Jack Craddock	1936; 1942–1947	
Bob Prince	1947–1975; 1985	
Dick Bingham	1955–1957	
Joe Tucker	1955	
Paul Long	1957–1962	
Jim Woods	1958–1969	
Don Hoak	1965–1966	
Nellie King	1967–1975	
Gene Osborn	1970	
Milo Hamilton	1976–1979	
Lanny Frattare	1976–2008	
Nellie Briles	1979–1980	
Dave Martin	1980	
John Sanders	1981–1989	
Dave Giusti	1982	
Jim Rooker	1981–1993	
Steve Blass	1983–2019	
Willie Stargell	1983–1984	
Alan Cutler	1986	
Mike Lange	1986–1987	
Kent Derdivanis	1990–1993	
Bob Walk	1994–present	
Greg Brown	1994–present	
John Wehner	2005–present	
Tim Neverett	2009–2015	
Joe Block	2016–present	
Michael McKenry	2020–2021	
Kevin Young	2021–present	
Matt Capps	2021–present	
Neil Walker	2021–present	

== Footnotes ==
- ^{a} Each year is linked to an article about that particular MLB season.

== See also ==
- List of current Major League Baseball announcers
