= Joe Block =

Sportscast announcer

John Joseph Block (born March 1, 1978) is a radio and TV play-by-play announcer who calls games for the Pittsburgh Pirates on SportsNet Pittsburgh, KDKA-AM, and KDKA-FM, joining the team in 2016 after four years with the Milwaukee Brewers.

== Broadcasting career ==
Block works with Pirates play-by-play announcer Greg Brown; color analysts Michael McKenry, Bob Walk, Neil Walker, Matt Capps, Kevin Young, and John Wehner; and field reporters Hannah Mears and Dan Potash to complete the Pirates broadcast team. Block previously worked with veteran broadcaster and former Major League Baseball catcher Bob Uecker, as well as former MLB pitcher Steve Blass prior to his 2019 retirement.

He called minor league games for the Great Falls White Sox, Jacksonville Suns, Billings Mustangs, and select games for the final two seasons of the Montreal Expos. Block served as a post-game host for the Los Angeles Dodgers on the radio. He was the radio studio host and backup announcer for the New Orleans Hornets and handled play-by-play for various regional networks for college football and basketball before the Brewers hired him. On January 30, 2016 he was hired to serve as play-by-play announcer for the Pittsburgh Pirates replacing Tim Neverett who left to become the radio play-by-play voice for the Boston Red Sox. Neverett replaced Dave O'Brien who switched over to TV for the Red Sox after Don Orsillo left the team to join the San Diego Padres.

== Personal life ==
Block grew up in Roseville, Michigan. He then went to Chippewa Valley High School in Clinton Township, Michigan. He graduated from Michigan State University in 1999 and resided on the east side of Milwaukee with his wife, Bethany, when he was with the Brewers from 2012 to 2015. His wife is from the Pittsburgh area, where they reside with their three children.

== See also ==
- Pittsburgh Pirates broadcasters and media
