= Lanny Frattare =

American former sportscaster

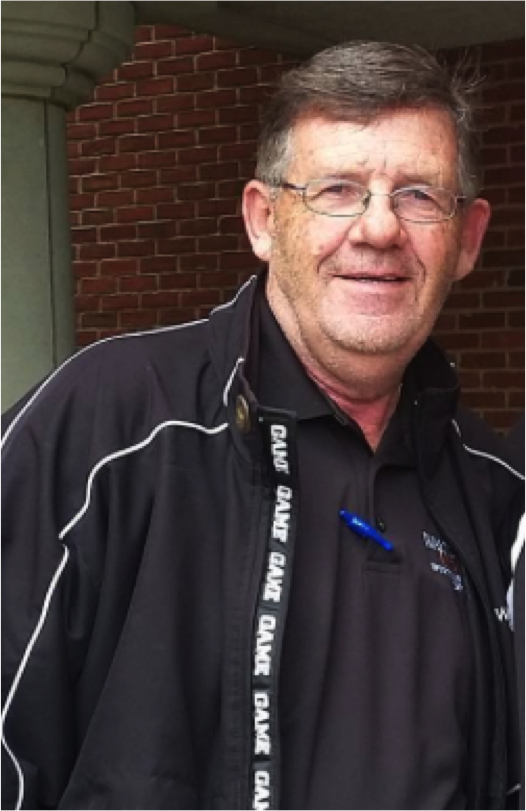
- Frattare at Waynesburg University in 2016
- Born: March 23, 1948 (age 78); Rochester, New York, U.S.
- Sports commentary career
- Team: Pittsburgh Pirates
- Genre: Play-by-play
- Sport: Major League Baseball

Lanny Lawrence Frattare (born March 23, 1948) is an American semi-retired sportscaster. For 33 years he was a play-by-play announcer for Major League Baseball's Pittsburgh Pirates, the longest such tenure in club history.

Currently, Frattare is the television voice of the West Virginia Mountaineers home baseball broadcasts on ESPN+. He also serves as a broadcaster with the TribLive High School Sports Network, providing play-by-play coverage and color commentary for WPIAL high school events.

In 2008, Frattare was nominated for the Ford Frick Award by the Baseball Hall of Fame for broadcasting excellence. On September 3, 2025, he was inducted into the Pirates Media Wall of Fame.

Frattare attended Ithaca College, graduating in 1970. He started his career in his hometown as a radio disk jockey at the city's top rated station, WBBF (AM). During his time in Rochester radio he expanded his on-air role to include work as a sportscaster and lead play-by-play broadcaster for the American Hockey League's Rochester Americans. As the radio broadcaster for the Pirates' AAA affiliate Charleston Charlies in 1974 and 1975, he was mentored by the hall of fame Pirates' broadcaster Bob Prince, who invited Frattare to Pittsburgh after the Charlies' seasons concluded and allowed him to take over the microphone on occasion.

In 1976, Frattare moved to Pittsburgh and joined the Pirates major league broadcasting crew on radio (KDKA) and cable television. He started as Milo Hamilton's junior partner, calling just two innings of most games and serving as Hamilton's color man. His role began to increase after Hamilton left following the 1979 season. The Pirates gave Frattare a new contract late in the 2006 season that was to keep him on the air into 2009. In August 2008, he announced his 5,000th Pirates game. He began sharing primary announcing duty with Greg Brown, as the Pirates evolved toward a transition that came with Frattare's retirement on October 1, 2008. Frattare announced he was retiring and would not return for the 2009 season.

Frattare was the lead announcer on the ESPN broadcast of the February 23, 1985, college basketball game between Indiana University and Purdue University during which Indiana coach, Bob Knight, threw a chair across the court, a moment which was frequently replayed on television.

Frattare has two children and two grandchildren from his first marriage. He remarried to the former choir director of Upper St. Clair High School, but they separated in late 2007. Over the past twenty years, he has hosted the Family Links Golf Classic which has raised over $1.6 million in support of mentally challenged individuals and their families.

On March 18, 2009, Frattare joined Waynesburg University as an assistant professor in communications in the Department of Communication and the faculty adviser of the university radio station, WCYJ-FM, while also doing some work with University Relations.

In 2010, he hosted the inaugural Sports Announcing Camp at Waynesburg University, with a week of programs and instruction for high school students interested in broadcasting.

== See also ==
- Pittsburgh Pirates broadcasters and media
