= Forbes Field =

Baseball field in Pittsburgh, Pennsylvania, US

Coordinates: 40°26′31″N 79°57′15″W

- "The House of Thrills" "The Old Lady of Schenley Park" "The Oakland Orchard"
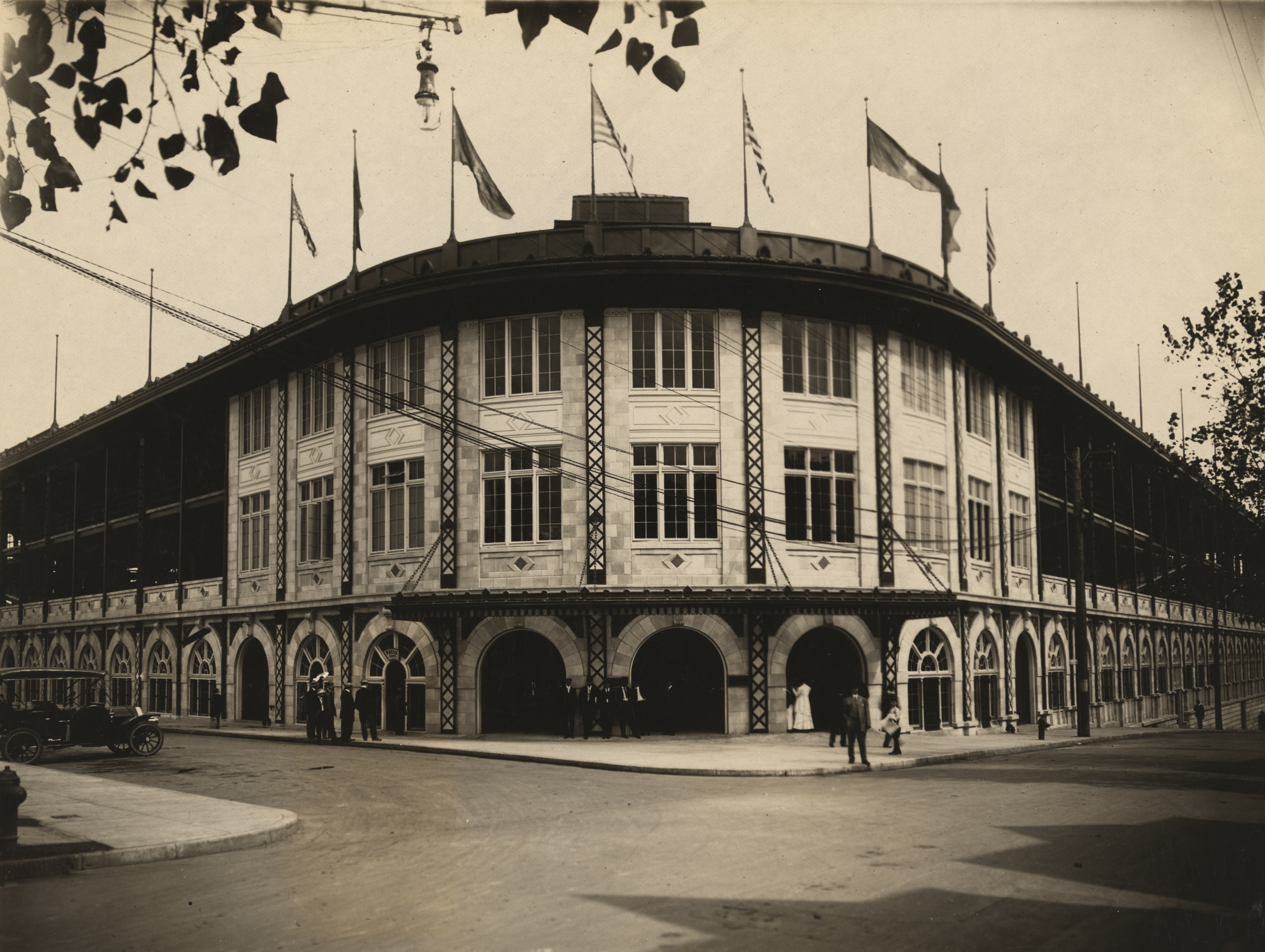
- Interactive map of Forbes Field
- Location: 230 South Bouquet St. in Oakland, adjacent to Schenley Park
- Capacity: 23,000 (1909); 41,000 (1925); 35,000 (1970)
- Surface: Grass
- Scoreboard: Hand-operated
- Field size: 1954–1970: Left field—365 feet (111 m); Left center—406 feet (124 m); Center field—457 feet (139 m); Right center—408 feet (124 m); Right field—375 feet (114 m)

Construction
- Groundbreaking: March 1, 1909
- Built: March–June 1909
- Opened: June 30, 1909
- Closed: June 28, 1970
- Demolished: 1971
- Cost: Estimated US$1–2 million ($35.8 million – $71.7 million in 2025 dollars)
- Architect: Charles Leavitt Jr.
- General contractor: Nicola Building Company

Tenants
- Pittsburgh Pirates (MLB) (1909–1970); Pittsburgh Steelers (NFL) (1933–1963); Philadelphia–Pittsburgh "Steagles" (NFL) (1943) "Card-Pitt" (NFL) (1944); Pittsburgh Panthers (NCAA) (1909–1924); Carnegie Tech Tartans (NCAA) (1922-1928); Duquesne Dukes (NCAA) (1933–1942, 1947–1950); Homestead Grays (Negro leagues) (1922–1939); Pittsburgh Americans (AFL) (1936–1937); Pittsburgh Phantoms (NPSL) (1967)

Pennsylvania Historical Marker
- Designated: July 7, 2006

Pittsburgh Landmark – PHLF
- Official name: Forbes Field wall: remnant
- Designated: 1977

Forbes Field was a baseball park in the Oakland neighborhood of Pittsburgh, Pennsylvania, from 1909 to June 28, 1970. It was the third home of the Pittsburgh Pirates, the city's Major League Baseball (MLB) team, and the first home of the Pittsburgh Steelers, the city's National Football League (NFL) franchise. From 1909 to 1924, the stadium also served as the home football field for the University of Pittsburgh "Pitt" Panthers. The stadium sat on Forbes Avenue, named for British general John Forbes, who fought in the French and Indian War and named the city in 1758.

The US$1 million ($35.8 million today) project was launched by Pittsburgh Pirates' owner Barney Dreyfuss to replace his franchise's second home, Exposition Park. The stadium was made of concrete and steel, the first such stadium in the National League and third in Major League Baseball, in a bid to be more durable than wooden ballparks. The Pirates opened Forbes Field on June 30, 1909, against the Chicago Cubs, and played the final game against the Cubs on June 28, 1970. The field featured a large playing surface, with the batting cage placed in the deepest part of center field during games. Seating was altered multiple times throughout the stadium's life; at times fans were permitted to sit on the grass in the outfield during overflow crowds. The Pirates won three World Series while at Forbes Field; the Pittsburgh Panthers football team had five undefeated seasons before moving in 1924. In 1958, broadcaster Bob Prince dubbed Forbes Field "The House of Thrills" for the then-resurgent Pirates and several games that saw late-inning heroics.

Some remnants of the ballpark still stand, surrounded by the campus of the University of Pittsburgh. Fans gather on the site annually on the anniversary of Bill Mazeroski's World Series winning home run, in what author Jim O'Brien writes is "one of the most unique expressions of a love of the game to be found in a major league city".

== History ==
=== Planning and design ===
In 1903, Pittsburgh Pirates' owner Barney Dreyfuss began to look for ground to build a larger capacity replacement for the team's then-current home, Exposition Park. Dreyfuss purchased seven acres of land near the Carnegie Library of Pittsburgh, adjacent to Schenley Park, with assistance from his friend, industrialist Andrew Carnegie. The low-priced land was selected so Dreyfuss could spend more on the stadium itself.

Dreyfuss signed a contract to "make the ballpark ... of a design that would harmonize with the other structures in the Schenley Park district." The site was initially labeled "Dreyfuss's Folly" due to its long distance—a 10-minute trolley ride—from downtown Pittsburgh, but the land around the park developed and criticisms were dropped. Official Pirates' records show that Forbes Field cost US$1 million for site acquisition and construction. However, some estimates place the cost at twice that amount.

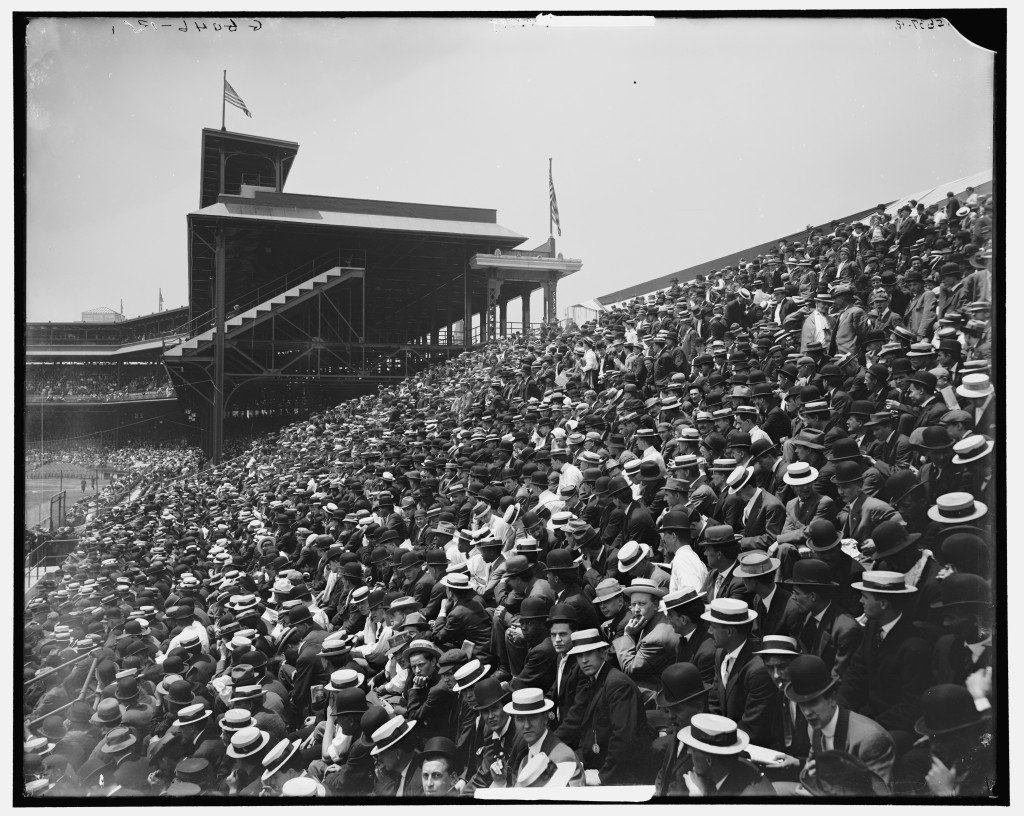
Left field bleachers at Forbes Field

Dreyfuss announced that unlike established wooden ballparks such as the Polo Grounds, he would build a three-tiered stadium out of steel and concrete to increase longevity—the first of its kind in the nation. Charles Wellford Leavitt Jr. was contracted to design the stadium's grandstand. A civil engineer, Leavitt had founded an engineering and landscape architecture firm in 1897. He had gained experience in steel and concrete constructs while designing the Belmont and Saratoga racetracks. Based on Dreyfuss' architectural requirements, Leavitt presented a plan for Forbes Field—the only ballpark he designed. Pirates' manager Fred Clarke also had input into the stadium's design, giving groundskeepers advice on the field, in addition to designing and patenting a device to spread and remove a canvas tarpaulin over the infield in case of rain.

Initial work on the land began on January 1, 1909, but ground was not officially broken until March 1. Nicola Building Company built the stadium in 122 days and play began less than four months after ground was broken, on June 30. Though the scoreboard was operated by hand, the ballpark featured multiple innovations such as ramps and elevators to assist fan movement throughout the park, a room for the umpires, and a visiting team clubhouse similar to the Pirates'. The facade of the stadium featured "buff-colored terra cotta" spelling out "PAC" for the Pittsburgh Athletic Company. The light green steelwork contrasted with the red slate of the roof. Some members of the press urged Dreyfuss to name the stadium after himself. Instead, he decided to honor General John Forbes, who captured Fort Duquesne from the French in 1758 and rebuilt a new "Fort Pitt" at the site.

After Dreyfuss died in 1935, there was renewed media interest in renaming the stadium "Dreyfuss Field". His widow, Florence, resisted. However, a monument to Dreyfuss was placed in center field just in front of the wall.

=== Opening ===
"Pittsburg can now boast of the world's finest baseball park. It is a marvel of which people in other cities can have no adequate conception until they come here and see it."

— Fred Clarke, 1909

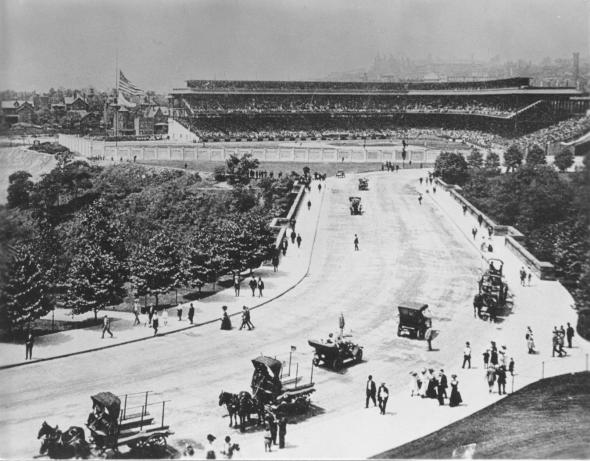
Forbes Field and Bellefield Bridge, 1909

The first game was played at Forbes Field on June 30, 1909, one day after the Pittsburgh Pirates had defeated the Chicago Cubs, 8–1, at Exposition Park. Fans began to arrive at the stadium six and one-half hours early for the 3:30 p.m. game. Weather conditions were reported as clear skies with a temperature around 80 degrees. Flags flew at half staff to honor the recently deceased presidents of the Philadelphia Phillies and the Boston Doves.

Various National League officials and owners attended the pre-game ceremonies, including league president Harry Pulliam, Civil War veteran and manager of Pittsburgh's first professional baseball team Al Pratt, and American League president Ban Johnson. Pittsburgh Mayor William A. Magee threw out the stadium's ceremonial first pitch, tossing it from the second tier to John M. Morin, Director of Public Safety, on the field below. Morin then went to the mound and threw the first pitch to the Pirate catcher.

The Pittsburgh Press wrote, "the ceremonies were witnessed by the largest throng that ever attended an event of this kind in this or any other city in the country...Forbes Field is so immense—so far beyond anything else in America in the way of a baseball park—that old experts, accustomed to judging crowds at a glance, were at a loss for reasonable figures." Records, however, show that the first game was attended by a standing-room only crowd of 30,338.

The first batter at Forbes Field was future Hall of Famer Johnny Evers, the Cubs second baseman and leadoff batter. He was hit by a pitch and later in the inning scored the first run. The first hit by a Pirate was by catcher George Gibson, who eventually became a Pirate manager. The Chicago Cubs won the first game, 3–2. Dreyfuss declared, "This is indeed the happiest day of my life."

=== Playing field evolution ===
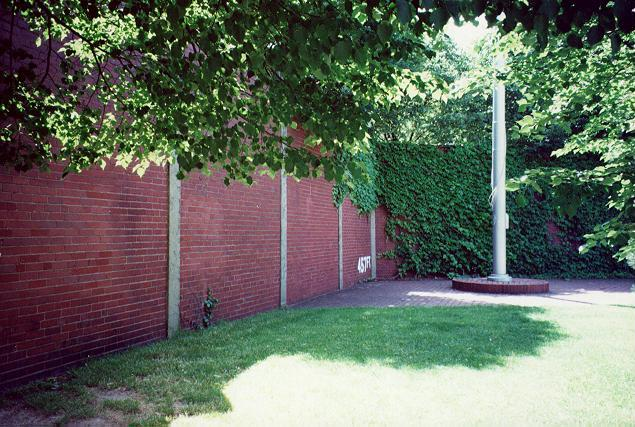
The Forbes Field outfield wall and flagpole in its original location in Oakland

The stadium was widely considered the best in the league.

Dreyfuss "hated cheap home runs and vowed he'd have none in his park", which led him to design a large playing field for Forbes Field. The original distances to the outfield fences in left, center, and right field were 360 feet (110 m), 462 feet (141 m) and 376 feet (115 m), respectively.

The left field foul pole initially intersected the bleacher section about two-thirds of the way toward where the bleacher corner touched the fence, at a distance of 301 feet (92 m),, leaving a narrow slice which could benefit a strict pull hitter, but which soon proved bothersome to left fielders.

In the early spring of 1912, the diamond was shifted so that the left field foul line intersected the end of the left field fence rather than the bleacher section. By 1914, the left field distance was stated as 365 feet (111 m), which eventually became the distance marked on the fence.

In 1921, the seating capacity was increased by the addition of several rows of new box seats.

In 1925, seating capacity received a bigger bump when the right field grandstand was extended into the corner and into fair territory, replacing a section of wooden bleachers. Construction of the new stands began in late winter and opened in June 1925.

The change reduced the foul line distance from 376 feet (115 m) to 300 feet (91 m) but increasing the near-right center distance to 375 feet (114 m). Dreyfuss made no secret of his mixed feelings regarding this move, and in May 1930, in response to American League President E. S. Barnard's proposed plan to stem the recent flood of sub-350-foot home runs, Dreyfuss readily complied by erecting a 28-foot (8.5 m) high screen.

Even at this long distance from home plate, the fence stood 12 feet (3.7 m) in height in left and center fields, with the new right field wall reduced to 9.5 feet (2.9 m) following the 1925 construction (later topped by the screen). The backstop was set at 110 feet (34 m) behind home plate, larger than the average of 60 feet (18 m) in most stadiums of the time. Additional seating eventually cut down the plate-to-screen distance to a still larger-than-average 75 feet (23 m).

With such a large outfield space, triples and inside-the-park home runs were common. The Pirates hit a record eight triples in a single game, on May 30, 1925. Conversely, the stadium was one of the most difficult to hit over-the-fence home runs. The closeness of the right field line from 1925 onward was the only area that compromised Dreyfuss' original design concept. Even at that, the right field wall angled sharply out to 375 feet (114 m), a typical distance for a major league power alley. Babe Ruth hit the final three home runs of his career in Forbes Field on May 25, 1935; the third of these cleared the 89-foot (27 m) right field roof and was considered the longest home run in the park's history.

The last major change to the outfield came in 1946, when the fence in left and center was replaced by a brick wall. The fence had been painted green, while the bricks were of a reddish color. Ivy was planted at the base of the new wall, restoring the green background enjoyed by batters.

Although Forbes Field developed a reputation as a "pitcher-friendly" ballpark, there was never a no-hitter thrown in the more than 4,700 games at the stadium.

The field itself consisted of natural grass grown in Crestline, Ohio.

"There wasn't much flubdubber. You just got a ballgame. If you didn't like it, you could stay home."

— Art McKennan, PA announcer

Until 1942, Forbes Field's batting cage, when not in use, was stored on the field, in front of the stands directly behind home plate, a bare-bones but viable solution rendered obsolete by the introduction that season of a new, considerably larger cage. During that season and part of 1943, the new cage resided in foul territory, down the right field line, near the Pirates' bullpen. At some point prior to July 26, 1943, evidently prompted by numerous instances of the relocated cage continuing to impact balls in play, the Pirates settled on what would become its permanent and, by far, best-remembered home: in fair territory, just to the left of the 457-foot (139 m) marker in deepest left-center.

The open part of the cage faced the wall, its rear effectively serving as a convex fence, somewhat akin to that surrounding the base of the light tower standing just to the left (as well as those surrounding the left field and right-center field towers). Unlike the batting cage and the flagpole just to its right, the light towers themselves—as opposed to the aforementioned fences—were not in play; a batted ball striking any one of them, or landing inside the surrounding fence, was a home run.

In 1947, well after Dreyfuss' death, and upon the arrival of veteran slugger Hank Greenberg, the bullpens were moved from foul territory to the base of the scoreboard in left field and were fenced in, cutting 30 feet (9.1 m) from the left field area, from 365 feet (111 m) to 335 feet (102 m) down the line and 406 feet (124 m) to 376 feet (115 m) in left-center field. These were not abnormal major league outfield distances, but the obvious attempt to take advantage of Greenberg's bat led the media to dub the area "Greenberg Gardens". Greenberg retired after the season, but by then Ralph Kiner was an established slugger with the Pirates, and the bullpen was redubbed "Kiner's Korner". Kiner was traded after the 1953 season, and the field was restored to its previous configuration in time for the 1954 season.

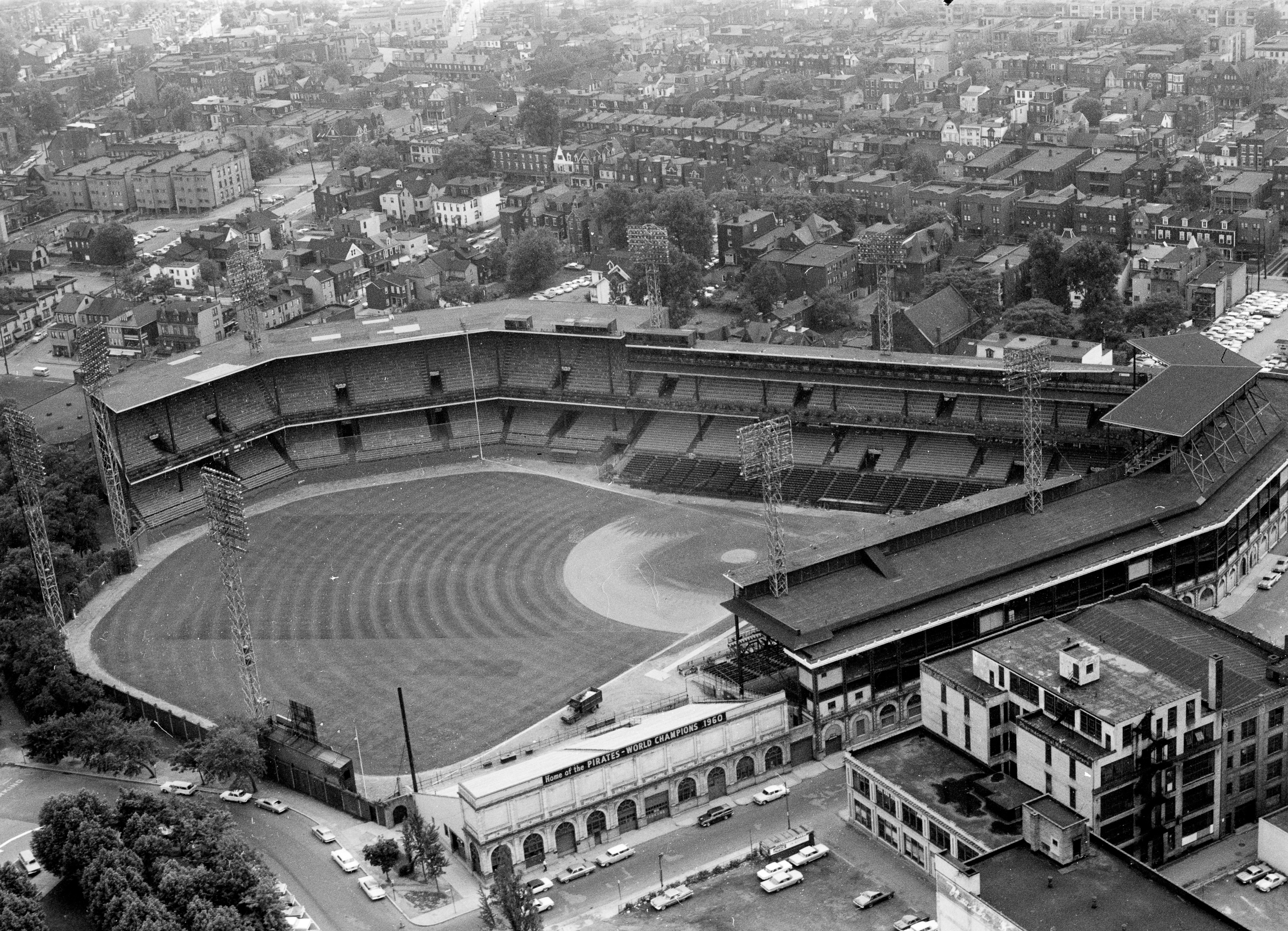
Forbes Field circa 1963, as seen from the University of Pittsburgh's Cathedral of Learning

The final posted dimensions of the ballpark were left field line 365 feet (111 m), left-center field 406 feet (124 m), deepest left-center 457 feet (139 m), deep right-center 436 feet (133 m), right-center field 375 feet (114 m), and right field line 300 feet (91 m). The only marker in exact straightaway center field was the Barney Dreyfuss monument, which sat on the playing field just in front of the wall. Some sources stated 442 feet (135 m) as the distance to straightaway center. Some sources also stated 408 feet (124 m) as a right-center distance, to the unmarked point where the center field wall intersected the end of the double-deck stands.

Forbes Field's outfield fences / walls featured no advertising, except a 32-foot (9.8 m) United States Marine Corps billboard during the 1943 season.

The infield developed a "rock-hard" surface throughout the stadium's history. During the final game of the 1960 World Series, Yankees shortstop Tony Kubek was struck in the throat with a ball that bounced at an unexpected angle off the hard dirt surface, breaking up a potentially rally-killing double play and causing Kubek to exit the game. Pittsburgh went on to win the game and the championship.

On occasions when rainfall soaked the pitcher's mound, groundskeepers would burn gasoline on the mound to dry it off.

=== Seating and tickets ===
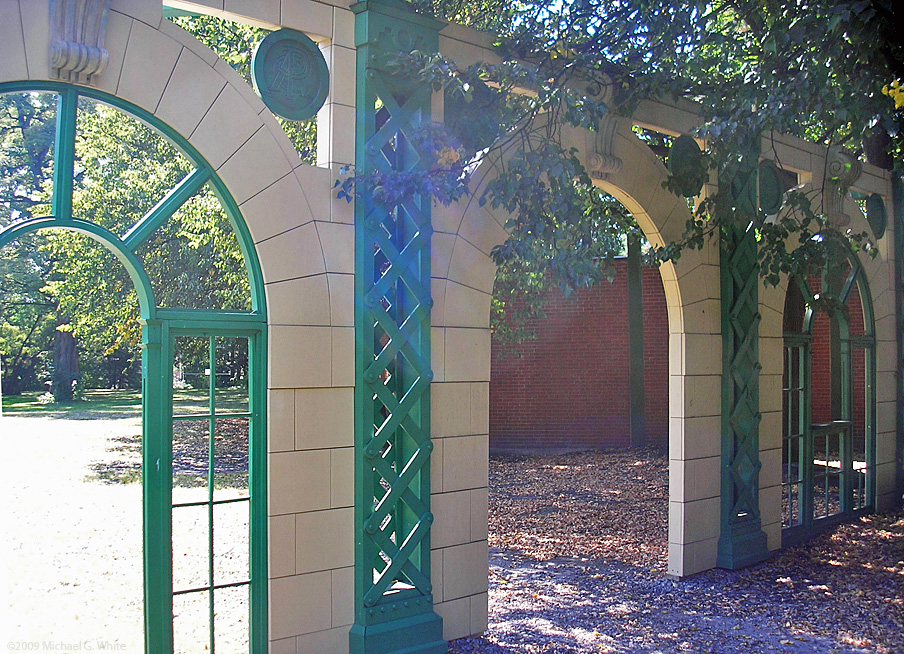
A recreated entrance, including ticket window, located near the remaining outfield wall

Forbes Field had an original capacity of 25,000, the largest in the league at the time. Seating at the stadium was remodeled numerous times, peaking at a capacity of 41,000 in 1925 and closing in 1970 at 35,000 seats. On opening day, ticket prices ranged from $1.25 (equal to $44.79 today) for box seats and $1 (equal to $35.83 today) for reserved grand stand sections; temporary bleachers were set up for the occasion and cost $0.50. Ticket prices were considered high for the day and steel pillars supporting the roof occasionally blocked fans' views of the field. Two thousand bleacher seats were situated along the left field side; tickets were sold for a maximum of $1. When winning streaks attracted high attendance to games, fans were permitted to sit on the grass in right field, provided they agreed to allow a player to catch any ball hit in the area. The lowest season of attendance came in 1914, when 139,620 people attended games; the highest at the stadium came in 1960, when 1,705,828 people watched the Pirates play. On September 23, 1956, the stadium's largest crowd, 44,932, gathered to see the home team play the Brooklyn Dodgers. The game was cut short in the top of the ninth inning, after a rain delay forced it past the Pennsylvania Sunday curfew. The Dodgers won the game 8–2 the following day. At 200 people, June 10, 1938, was believed to have marked the smallest crowd to ever attend a Pirates game (against the Philadelphia Phillies), however, Baseball Reference has the attendance for that game listed as 1,034. On September 30, 1962, a crowd of 40,916 people saw the Steelers defeated by the New York Giants, at the Steelers' highest-attended game at the stadium.

=== Closing and demolition ===
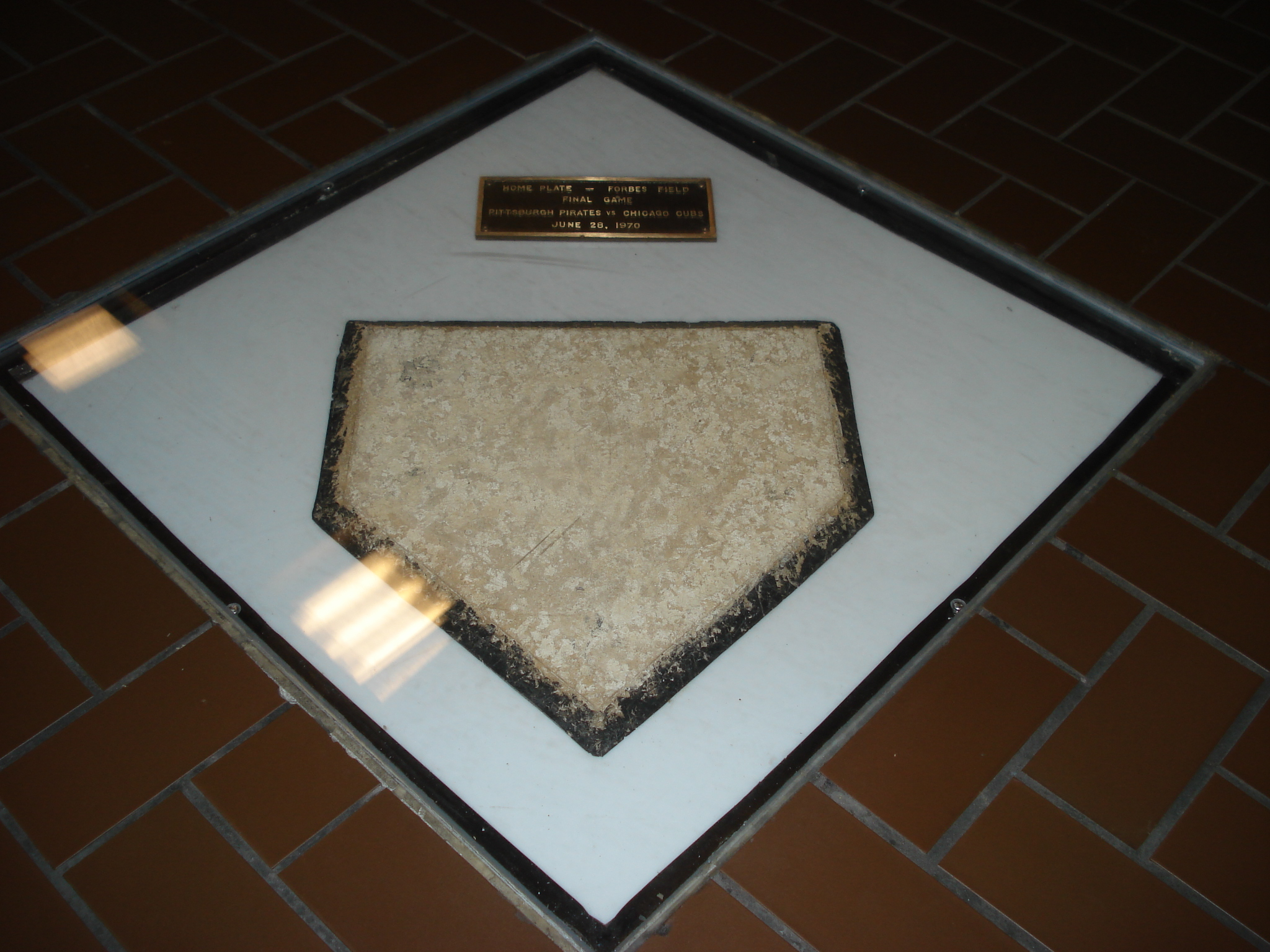
Home plate of Forbes Field, located in Posvar Hall at the University of Pittsburgh.

Though Forbes Field was praised upon its opening, it began to show its age after 60 years of use. The park was the second oldest baseball field in the league at the time – only Shibe Park in Philadelphia was older (it was replaced in 1971 by Veterans Stadium). The location of the park, which initially was criticized for not being developed, grew into a "bustling business district" which led to a lack of parking space. One sportswriter wrote that The House of Thrills had become "as joyless as a prison exercise yard".

Following a plan to expand their adjacent campus, the University of Pittsburgh purchased Forbes Field in 1958, with an agreement to lease the stadium to the Pirates until a replacement could be built. A proposal for a new sports stadium in Pittsburgh was first made in 1948, but plans did not attract much attention until the late 1950s. Construction began on Three Rivers Stadium on April 25, 1968.

The Pittsburgh Pirates and the Chicago Cubs played a double-header on June 28, 1970. Pittsburgh won the first game 3–2. In the later game Al Oliver hit the last home run in the park, and Matty Alou drove in two runs as the Pirates closed the 62-year-old stadium with a 4–1 victory. The 40,918 spectators in attendance stood and cheered as Dave Giusti retired Willie Smith for the final out (recorded by Bill Mazeroski) at the stadium. Pirates Hall of Famer Roberto Clemente played 15 seasons at Forbes Field. He was emotional during the last game saying, "I spent half my life there." After the game, home plate was dug up and taken by helicopter to Three Rivers Stadium to be installed in the artificial turf.

A community group attempted to rescue the structure from demolition, proposing such things as a stage, apartments and a farmers market for the site and comparing it to the Eiffel Tower in significance.

The abandoned structure suffered two separate fires that damaged the park, on December 24, 1970, and July 17, 1971. Eleven days after the second fire, demolition began, and the site was cleared for use by the University of Pittsburgh.

=== Memorials ===
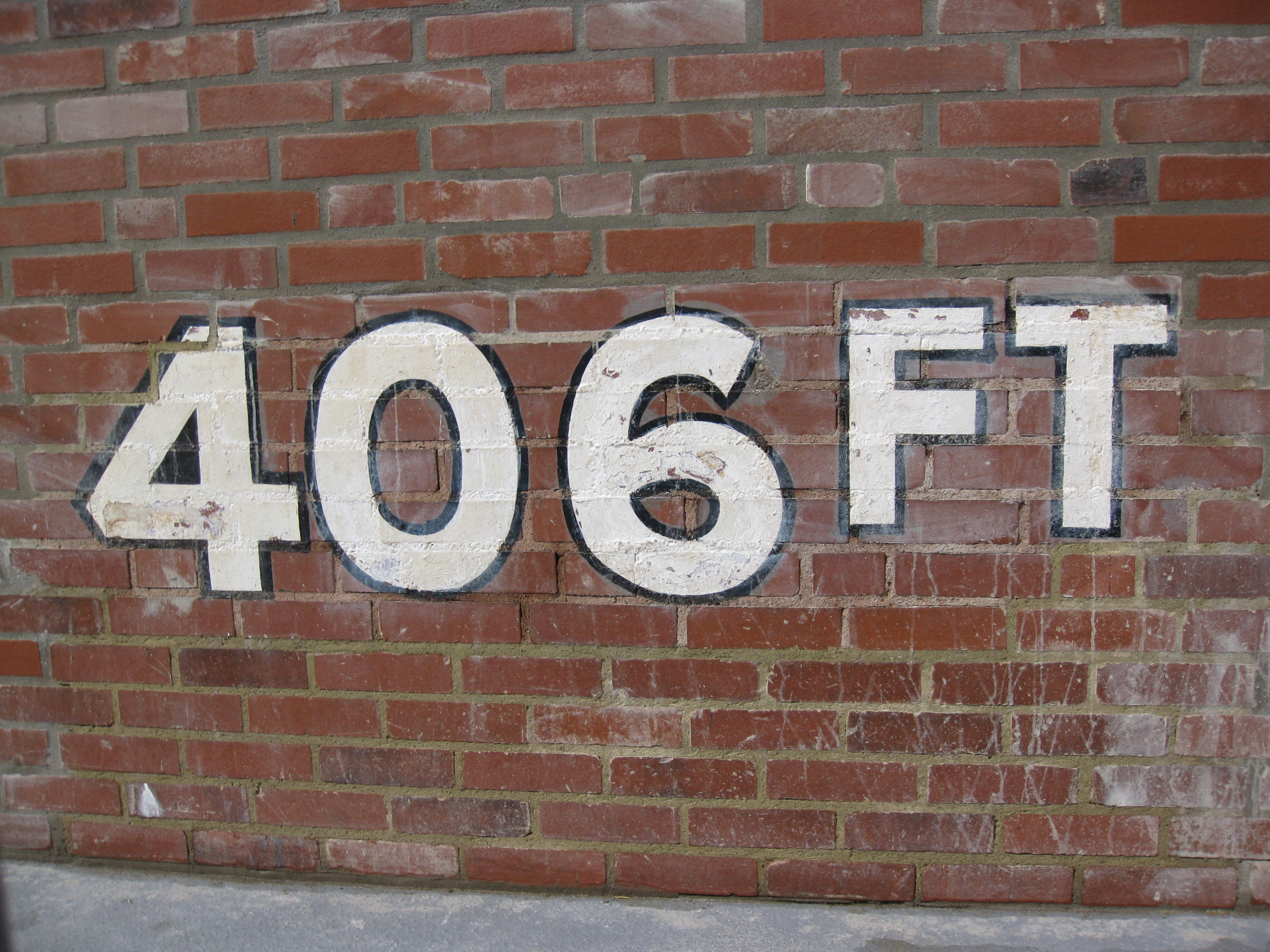
The left field wall was moved to PNC Park in 2009

In 1955, a statue of Honus Wagner was dedicated in Schenley Plaza adjacent to Forbes Field. Several thousand fans attended the dedication as well as Wagner himself. His failing health caused him to never leave his open convertible in which he arrived. Wagner died near the end of that year. The 1,800-pound (820 kg) statue was moved to Three Rivers Stadium in 1970. Today, the statue stands at the home plate entrance of PNC Park.

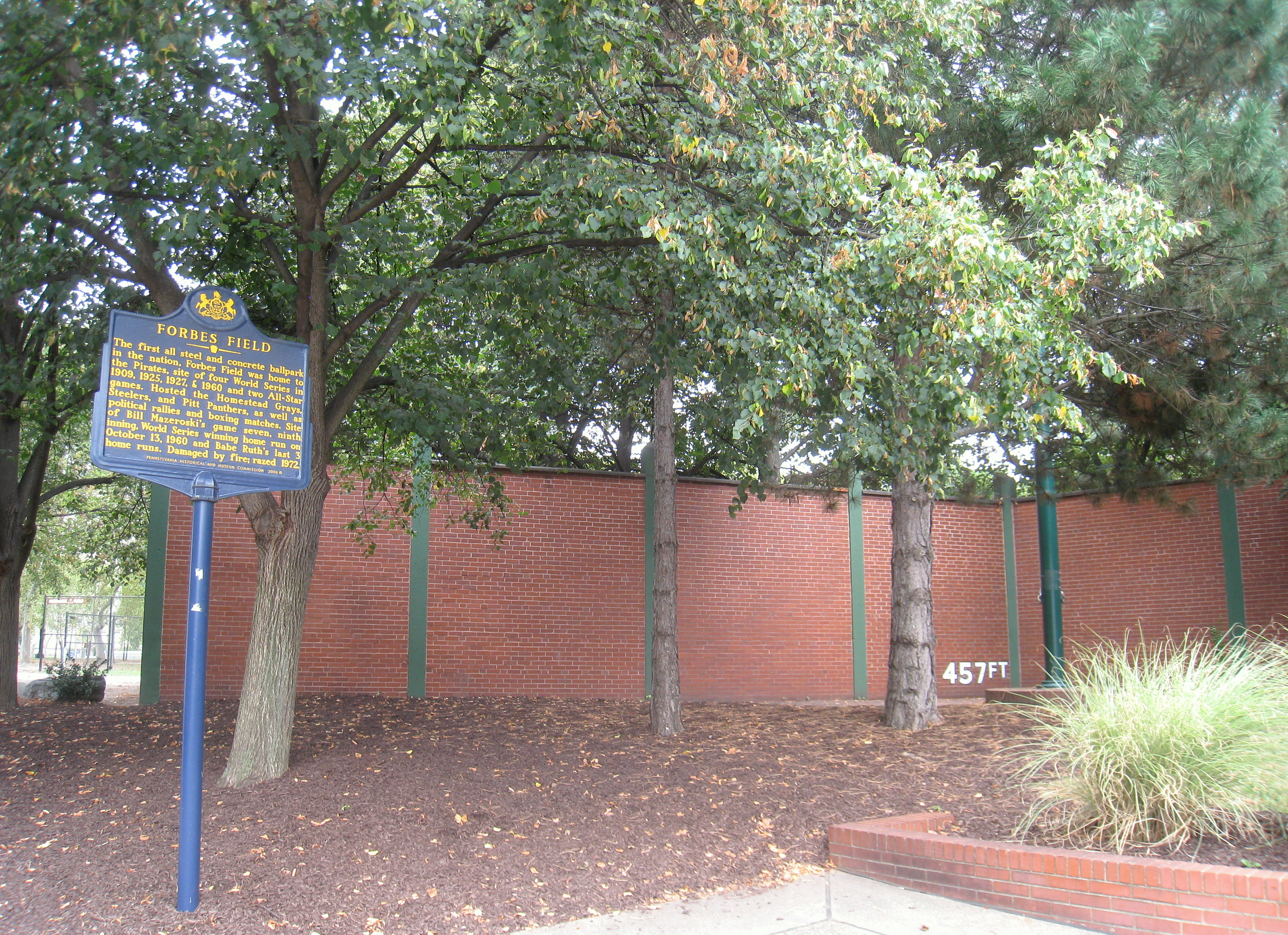
Forbes Field Monument, Pittsburgh, PA

The portion of the left field wall over which Bill Mazeroski hit his walk-off home run to end the 1960 World Series, between the scoreboard and the "406 FT" sign, no longer stands at its original location. A portion of that wall, including the distance marker, had been sliced off and moved to the Allegheny Club at Three Rivers Stadium. Before the Three Rivers demolition, the section of the wall was salvaged, and in 2009 it was restored and placed on the Riverwalk outside of PNC Park.

Meanwhile, the original location of that wall is outlined by bricks extending from the left-center field wall across Roberto Clemente Drive and into the sidewalk. A plaque embedded in the sidewalk marks the spot where Mazeroski's home run cleared the wall. The left-center and center field brick wall with "457 FT" and "436 FT" painted on it still stands at its original location, along with the stadium's flagpole, adjacent to the University of Pittsburgh's Mervis and Posvar Halls.

Despite not technically being the correct section of wall where Mazeroski's famous home run cleared, it is often locally referred to as "Mazeroski's Wall." This portion of the wall remained after Forbes Field was torn down, and was refurbished in 2006 in time for the All-Star Game hosted in Pittsburgh. A wooden replica of an entrance to the stadium, including a ticket window and players entrance, was constructed and placed near the remaining wall in 2006.

The home plate used in the stadium's final game remains preserved in the University of Pittsburgh's Posvar Hall. Its location has been altered; author John McCollister wrote, "Had architects placed home plate in its precise spot about half of the Pirates fans could not view it. The reason: it would have to be on display in the fifth stall of the ladies' restroom." The original location of the home plate has been more recently determined by others to be approximately 81 feet (25 m) away from its current display, just inside the GSPIA/Economics Library, and not in a restroom as has been popularly believed.

A ceremony is held each October 13 at the outfield wall in Oakland to listen to a taped broadcast of the final game of the 1960 World Series. The tradition was started by Squirrel Hill resident Saul Finkelstein, who at 1:05 pm on October 13, 1985, sat alone at the base of the flagpole and listened to the NBC radio broadcast of Chuck Thompson and Jack Quinlan. Finkelstein continued the tradition for eight more years, until word spread and other people began attending in 1993. On October 13, 2000—the game's 40th anniversary—over 600 people attended to listen to the broadcast, including Mazeroski himself. For the 50th anniversary, on October 13, 2010, a plaque honoring Mazeroski was dedicated and more than 1,000 attended the broadcast, including Mazeroski and several other former Pirates.

== Events ==
=== Baseball ===
Seating capacity for baseball:
| Years | Capacity |
|---|---|
| 1909–1914 | 23,000 |
| 1915–1924 | 25,000 |
| 1925–1937 | 41,000 |
| 1938 | 40,000 |
| 1939–1941 | 33,537 |
| 1942–1946 | 33,467 |
| 1947–1952 | 33,730 |
| 1953–1959 | 34,249 |
| 1960–1970 | 35,000 |

In 1909, Forbes Field's opening season, the Pirates beat the Detroit Tigers in the World Series. It was the only meeting of eventual Hall of Famers Honus Wagner and Ty Cobb.

On October 2, 1920, Forbes Field hosted the last triple-header in MLB history.

On August 5, 1921, Forbes Field was the site of the first live radio broadcast of a Major League Baseball game in the United States. Harold Arlin announced the play-by-play action between the Pittsburgh Pirates and the Philadelphia Phillies over KDKA from a box seat next to the first-base dugout. Regular broadcasts of Pirates games began over KDKA in 1936, announced by A. K. "Rosey" Rowswell, a local humorist and friend of team owner Bill Benswanger. Rowswell is quoted as describing his broadcasting with, "It's not just play-by-play that matters. It's what you say in between the pitches that counts." His style influenced junior partner Bob Prince, who began broadcasting in 1948. Rowswell broadcast games at Forbes Field until his death in 1955.

In 1925, the Pirates became the first team to come back from a three-game to one deficit to defeat the Washington Senators and win the World Series. Pittsburgh's third and final World Series championship while they played at Forbes Field came in 1960. Bill Mazeroski hit the first home run to end a World Series, the only walk-off home run in World Series Game 7 history. These two World Series victories mark the only times that the Pirates clinched a championship at home, with Forbes Field hosting both.

Two unassisted triple plays were turned at Forbes Field. The first took place on May 7, 1925, when Pittsburgh's Glenn Wright achieved the feat. Two seasons later, in 1927, Jimmy Cooney—who had been a victim of the first triple play—also acquired three outs by himself.

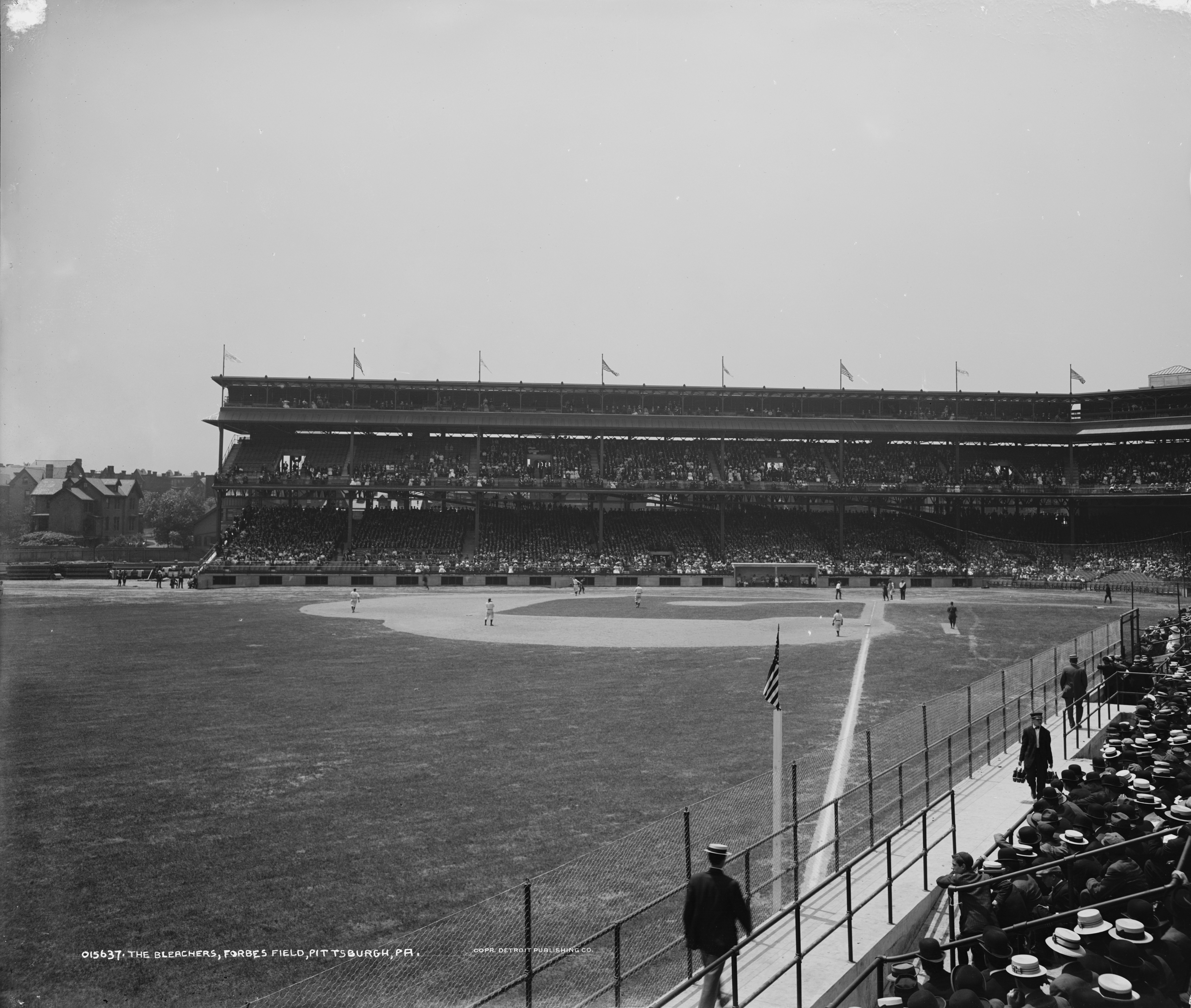
Forbes Field in its early years.

On May 25, 1935, at Forbes Field, Babe Ruth hit the last three home runs of his career as his Boston Braves lost to the Pirates, 11–7. His last home run cleared the right field stands roofline, making him the first player to ever do so.

On October 8, 1946, six months before his major league debut, Jackie Robinson played with his African American all-stars against Honus Wagner's all-stars.

Most of the game-action scenes from the 1951 film Angels in the Outfield were filmed at the stadium.

On May 28, 1956, Dale Long of the Pirates took what one author has stated was the first-ever curtain call in baseball history, after hitting home runs in eight consecutive games caused fans to cheer for five minutes.

The Homestead Grays of the Negro leagues played all home games at Forbes Field from 1922 to 1939. Grays owner Cumberland Posey became friends with Dreyfuss, who rarely missed a Grays game. In 1930, Josh Gibson made his premiere for the Grays at Forbes Field. Also in 1930, the Grays and the Kansas City Monarchs played the first baseball game at night in Pittsburgh on July 18, 1930. A crowd of over 15,000 was expected. Floodlights were installed the day before the game after they were transported from Cleveland, where the Grays and Monarchs had played on July 16. Six members of the Grays' 1936 team have been inducted into the Baseball Hall of Fame. Beginning in 1937, the Grays won nine consecutive Negro National League championships.

The University of Pittsburgh's baseball team also often used Forbes Field for home games.

=== Football ===
The University of Pittsburgh's football team moved from Exposition Park into Forbes Field upon its opening in 1909 and played there until 1924 when it moved into the larger Pitt Stadium only a few blocks away. In their first game at Forbes Field on October 16, 1909, the Panthers defeated Bucknell University 18–6. In 1910, Pitt's second year at Forbes Field, the Panthers went undefeated without allowing a single point. The Panthers had several successful seasons while playing at Forbes Field, including five in which they went undefeated and were awarded national championship titles in 1910, 1915, 1916, 1917, and 1918.

During their years at Forbes Field, Pitt's teams were led by Hall of Fame coaches Joe Thompson, Glenn "Pop" Warner and Jock Sutherland. Forbes Field was the site of yet another broadcasting first when on October 8, 1921, Harold W. Arlin announced live play-by-play action of the Pitt-West Virginia football game on radio station KDKA, the first live radio broadcast of a college football game in the United States. Duquesne University also played many of their home games there in the 1930s and 1940s.

The 1926 Carnegie Tech Tartans football team pulled off one of the greatest upsets in sports history by defeating the 8–0 Notre Dame Fighting Irish, shutting them out, 19–0. Legendary ND head coach, Knute Rockne, thought the Pittsburgh team would be easily defeated and did not show up for the game.

Pittsburgh native, Art Rooney founded his NFL team under the name the Pittsburgh Pirates, on July 8, 1933, for $2,500 ($62,179 in present-day terms). The franchise's first game, against the New York Giants, was held on September 20, 1933, at Forbes Field. The Giants won the game 23–2 in front of 25,000 people. Rooney wrote of the game, "The Giants won. Our team looks terrible. The fans didn't get their money's worth." The Pirates rebounded to gain their first ever franchise victory a week later at Forbes Field, against the Chicago Cardinals.

In 1940, the NFL's Pirates were renamed the Steelers, and otherwise struggled during much of their three-decades of tenancy at Forbes. The club achieved its first winning record in 1942; its tenth season of existence. On November 30, 1952, the Steelers met the New York Giants at Forbes Field for a snowy afternoon game. Pittsburgh entered the game with a 3–6 record, but went on to set multiple team records, including scoring nine touchdowns, to win the game 63–7. Excited by their team's play, the 15,140 spectators ran onto the field and began to tear the field goal posts out of the ground.

The University of Pittsburgh's acquisition of Forbes Field in 1958 gave the Steelers some options, and they began transferring some of their home games to the much larger Pitt Stadium that year. The Steelers played their final game at Forbes Field on December 1, 1963. The franchise moved to Pitt Stadium exclusively the following season.

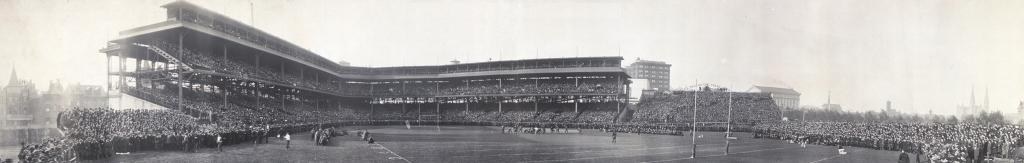
A Pittsburgh Panthers game against Washington & Jefferson College – 1915

=== Boxing and other events ===
Boxing bouts were held at Forbes Field from the 1910s to the 1950s, attracting crowds of over 15,000 people. On June 23, 1919, Harry "The Pittsburgh Windmill" Greb—the only boxer to beat Gene Tunney—defeated Mike Gibbons in a ten-round bout at Forbes Field. On July 18, 1951, the heavyweight boxing championship was held at the stadium. In seven rounds, Ezzard Charles was knocked out by Jersey Joe Walcott.

Another bout on September 25, 1939, was attended by 17,000 people including Art Rooney and Pie Traynor. Pittsburgh native Billy Conn defended his light heavyweight title against Melio Bettina, whom he had beaten months earlier. Conn won the bout by decision in 15 rounds. On June 18, 1941, Conn fought Joe Louis at New York City's Polo Grounds, in an attempt to become the world heavyweight champion. The Pirates and the New York Giants, who were playing at Forbes Field, were called into their dugouts while the 24,738 fans in attendance listened to the radio broadcast of the hour-long bout. Conn led the bout into the final round, but fought for the knockout and was knocked out himself.

On Sunday, October 17, 1909, at 3:00 p.m. a communion service was held at Forbes Field as the culmination of the International Centennial Celebration and Conventions of the Disciples of Christ marking the 100th anniversary of the signing of the "Declaration and Address" by Thomas Campbell in September 1809. Campbell was a founding father of the American Restoration Movement (Disciples of Christ, Christian Church, Churches of Christ). Delegates and members of churches from all over the world were present.

The Mine Safety and Health Administration hosted a mine rescue and safety demonstration at Forbes on October 30, 1911. The event included first-aid and rescue demonstrations. Around 15,000 attended the event, including President William H. Taft. Forbes Field also hosted circuses and concerts.

Events and tenants
| Preceded by Exposition Park | Home of the Pittsburgh Pirates; 1909–1970 | Succeeded by Three Rivers Stadium |
| Preceded by Exposition Park | Home of the Pittsburgh Panthers; 1909–1924 | Succeeded by Pitt Stadium |
| Preceded by first stadium | Home of the Pittsburgh Steelers; 1933–1963 | Succeeded by Pitt Stadium |
| Preceded by Shibe Park; Memorial Stadium | Host of the Major League Baseball All-Star Game; 1944; 1959 (Game 1) | Succeeded by Fenway Park; Los Angeles Memorial Coliseum |
