= Gene Osborn =

American sportscaster

Gene Osborn (August 10, 1922 – November 27, 1975) was a radio and television sportscaster in the 1950s, 1960s and 1970s, known primarily as a play-by-play for several major league baseball teams. He also had a substantial career in radio and television sports in Albuquerque, New Mexico, which he considered his adopted hometown.

Osborn, the son of Elizabeth (née Collins) and James Osborn, was born and raised in Davenport, Iowa, where he played baseball and other sports. He attended St. Ambrose University, then known as St. Ambrose College. Osborn was considered a top draft prospect for the St. Louis Cardinals. But his playing days were cut short when he suffered a knee injury. Osborn began his broadcast career in 1942 at station WQUA in Moline, Illinois.

In 1953, Osborn arrived in Albuquerque, where he soon became the sports director of radio station KABQ (AM). He did play-by-play broadcast for the Albuquerque Dukes of the West Texas–New Mexico League (and later the Western League). He was also the broadcaster for University of New Mexico football and basketball. In 1954, Osborn was elected president of the Albuquerque Pressbox Association. Also in the mid-fifties, Osborn became sports director at Albuquerque television station KOAT-TV, channel 7, an ABC affiliate. Later, the Dukes broadcasts were switched to KGGM, 610 AM, and Osborn went there.

From 1959 to 1964, Osborn broadcast The Game of the Day on the Mutual Broadcasting System and also did University of Michigan and Michigan State University sports broadcasts.

In 1965, Osborn was hired as a radio announcer for the Detroit Tigers, working with legendary announcer Ernie Harwell. Osborn was fired after the 1966 season and replaced by Ray Lane. Osborn then returned to Albuquerque, where Doubleday Broadcasting, the then-new owners of radio station KDEF 1150 AM, hired him as sports director. Once again, Gene Osborn would be the voice of UNM Lobo sports. He also resumed duties as sports director at KOAT television.

Osborn then worked with Bob Prince and Nellie King on the KDKA broadcasts of the Pittsburgh Pirates during the 1970 season. He became KOAT sports director in Albuquerque again in 1971. He left the Duke City in 1972 to work with Harry Caray, broadcasting the games of the Chicago White Sox over WMAQ. Throughout all of these moves, Osborn's family maintained its home in Albuquerque. Osborn and his wife were active in Albuquerque community affairs. For example, Gene Osborn was the chairman of the New Mexico campaign for cystic fibrosis research in 1971.

In 1974, Osborn became the sports director of TV station KBMA in Kansas City, Missouri, where he covered the NHL Kansas City Scouts as well as handling telecasts of the Kansas City Royals in 1975. During his career, Osborn also did broadcasts of the Detroit Red Wings NHL team.

Osborn died of kidney failure on November 27, 1975, at age 53 in Kansas City.
