= Harold Arlin =

American engineer and radio announcer

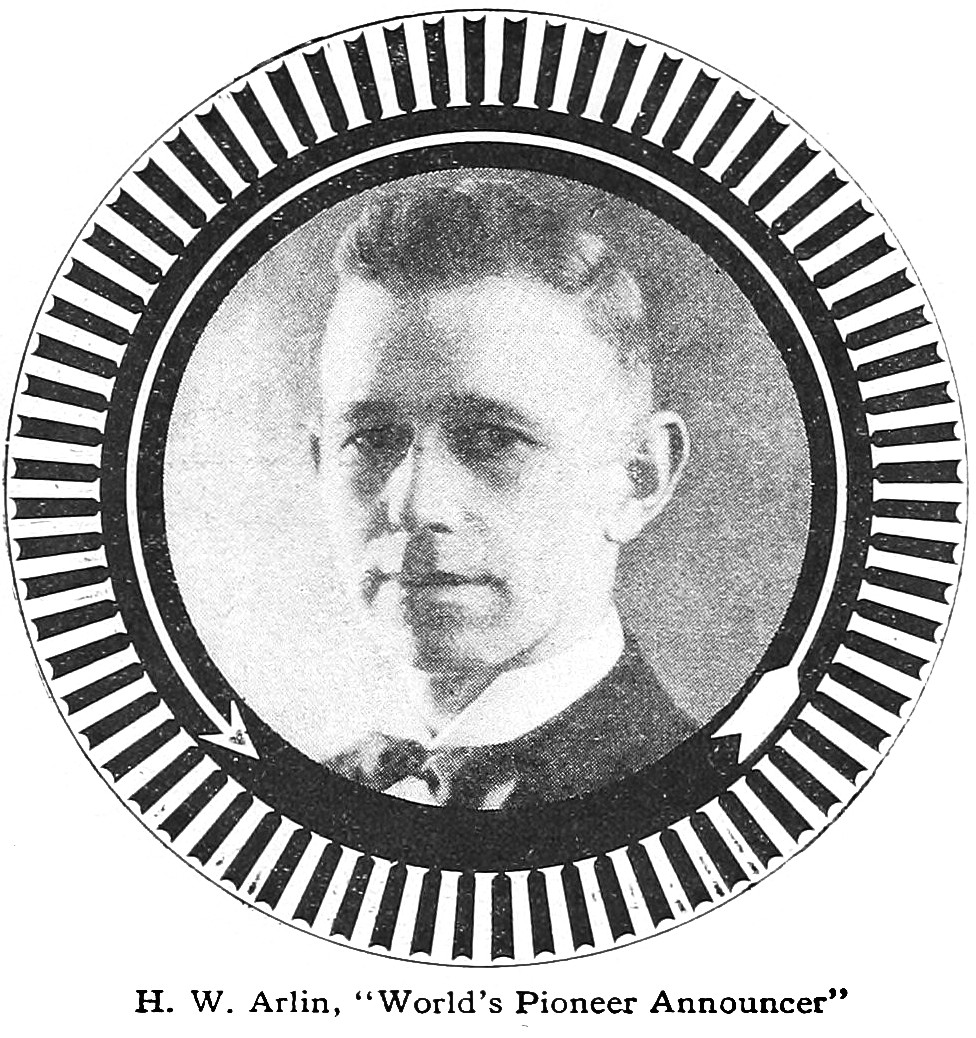
- Harold Arlin when he was announcing for KDKA, from Radio Age magazine
- Born: Harold Wampler Arlin; December 8, 1895; La Harpe, Illinois, U.S.
- Died: March 14, 1986 (aged 90); Bakersfield, California, U.S.
- Spouses: Emily Pace (m. 1920; died 1954); Ida Lee Dean
- Children: 3
- Presenting career
- Show: 1920 presidential election returns; 1921 International Lawn Tennis Challenge; 1921 West Virginia vs. Pittsburgh football game
- Stations: KDKA, Pittsburgh
- Country: United States

Harold Wampler Arlin (December 8, 1895 – March 14, 1986) was an American engineer and foreman and was arguably the world's first full-time and salaried announcer in broadcast radio.

Arlin originally worked as an engineer and later foreman for the Westinghouse Electric and Manufacturing Company when he was hired as a part-time announcer by KDKA, the nation's first commercially licensed radio station, in Pittsburgh in 1920. On November 2, 1920, Arlin made history as the radio's first announcer when he read over-the-air the returns to the 1920 presidential election between Senator Warren G. Harding and Governor James M. Cox.

Arlin was soon hired full-time at KDKA. During his tenure at KDKA, Arlin became the first to announce radio broadcasts of a baseball game (August 5, 1921), tennis match (August 6, 1921), football game (October 8, 1921), and a boxing match (September 14, 1923).

Arlin also interviewed many celebrities on the air, including Babe Ruth, Will Rogers, Lillian Gish and William Jennings Bryan. He spent five years at KDKA, where he was nicknamed the "Voice of America". Listeners on several continents could hear KDKA and Arlin's broadcasts, and The London Times called him "the best known American voice in Europe".

== Early life and education ==
Harold Wampler Arlin was born December 8, 1895, in La Harpe, Illinois to parents Byron Addison Arlin (1862–1918) and Emma (née Wampler) (1865–1944). His father was a farmer. Arlin also had an older sister named Lora. The Arlins moved to Carthage, Missouri, shortly after Harold's birth. Arlin graduated with a degree in engineering from the University of Kansas in 1917 and soon after moved to Pittsburgh where he obtained a job as an electrical engineer for the Westinghouse Electric Company.

== Radio ==
=== KDKA ===
==== 1920 presidential election returns ====
KDKA 1020 in Pittsburgh, Pennsylvania, received its broadcasting license on November 2, 1920, making the station the first commercially licensed radio station in the world. Dr. Frank Conrad, friend and fellow Westinghouse engineer as well as one of the founders of KDKA, invited Arlin and several others engineers from Westinghouse to a tour of the KDKA studios which, at the time, were in a shack on the roof of a Westinghouse plant. Whilst on the roof, another friend invited Arlin to say a few words into a microphone nearby. Arlin did, and because his voice proved clear, crisp, resonant, friendly and appealing, Arlin was hired as a full-time announcer, making him the first radio announcer in the world.

The station's inaugural broadcast was the reading of the returns from the election held earlier that day. Arlin read the results on a makeshift microphone in a shack on the roof atop the K Building of the Westinghouse Electric Company "East Pittsburgh Works" in Turtle Creek, Pennsylvania.

==== Pirates vs. Phillies game ====
On August 5, 1921, Arlin became the first person to announce a Major League Baseball game and the game itself was the first baseball game ever broadcast on radio. The teams playing that day were the Pittsburgh Pirates and the Philadelphia Phillies from the historic Forbes Field in Pittsburgh.

Arlin sat in a converted ground-level box seat at Forbes Field and provided play-by-play analysis of the game using a converted telephone as a microphone and some jerry-rigged equipment set up behind home plate. The game was broadcast over Arlin's KDKA. In the end, the visiting Phillies lost to the homebound Pirates 8-5.

KDKA's broadcast of the Pirates vs. Phillies game provided the inspiration for other radio stations across the country over the next few years to broadcast games like baseball and other professional sports. Soon after, radio baseball began its rapid ascent in American culture. Before radio, fans turned to visual displays or structures that showed the progress of a game. These structures were usually manually operated by someone who was informed about the game through telegraph.

==== Tennis and the West Virginia vs. Pittsburgh football game ====
On August 6, the very next day after the baseball game broadcast, Arlin announced the first radio broadcast of a tennis match also over KDKA. Arlin announced the quarterfinals of the match which began on the 4th. Australia took on Great Britain at the Allegheny County Club in Pittsburgh for the prestigious Davis Cup. Australia beat Great Britain 3-2 and went all the way to the finals only to lose to Japan 4-1.

KDKA again made history in the fall of 1921 when they broadcast the first live radio broadcast of a college football game. On October 8, Arlin, from the same box seat at Forbes Field used to broadcast the Pirates vs. Phillies game two months earlier, provided play-by-play to listeners at home of the Backyard Brawl rivalry game between the University of Pittsburgh Panthers and the West Virginia University Mountaineers.

Pittsburgh won the game 21–13, after West Virginia's George Hill returned a kick-off for a touchdown on the final play of the game.

==== Dempsey vs. Firpo fight ====
On September 14, 1923, heavyweights Jack Dempsey and Luis Ángel Firpo fought for the champion heavyweight title in what has been called the boxing match of the century. The fight marked the first time a Latin American fighter would challenge for the world Heavyweight title and was the first boxing match broadcast over the radio. Dempsey had been champion since 1919, and Firpo was one of the top heavyweights of the world, nicknamed "El Toro de las Pampas" ("The Bull of the Pampas"). 80,000 fans paid to see the fight live. Dempsey won the fight and Arlin did a recreation of the events over the radio from a wire report sent to him from the ringside in New York City. Just as Arlin told listeners, "Firpo threw a terrific right, knocking Dempsey out of the ring", his line to New York broke. Another announcer, standing by for such an emergency, grabbed the nearest piece of copy and began reading "...with hogs up two cents a pound...".

=== Other ===
==== Arlin goes international ====
That same year, Arlin announced the first short-wave broadcast to Great Britain. This gave Arlin more range and notoriety and popularity throughout the world. Arlin's voice soon could be heard on the short-wave radio broadcasts to the cities of Johannesburg, South Africa and Melbourne, Australia. His newfound recognition was noted in an article from The London Times that called Arlin "the best known American voice in Europe". In 1924, Arlin was voted most popular radio announcer and in 1925, he helped organized the Radio Announcers of America.

==== Celebrity interview ====
Harold Arlin is also believed amongst many historians to be the first to utilize the celebrity interview. There are no immediate available sources to dispute this claim. During his time at KDKA, Arlin interviewed on the air humorist Will Rogers, actress Lillian Gish, orator/politician William Jennings Bryan and baseball legend Babe Ruth. Arlin later recalled in an interview conducted in 1952 that Ruth had such a terrible case of "mike fright" that Arlin had to take the script out of his hands and read it himself.

== Later years and retirement ==
Arlin left KDKA and radio altogether in 1925. Arlin also left Pittsburgh taking his wife and children and moving to Mansfield, Ohio, the following year. Arlin also returned to engineering becoming the personnel manager for Westinghouse's Mansfield manufacturing plant.

Arlin also became very active and productive in the city of Mansfield. In his later years, Arlin accepted positions on Mansfield's Chamber of Commerce, Board of Education, local Boy Scouts, Community Fund and served as president of the city's Rotary Club from 1934 to 1935 and attended the Rotary International Convention in Nice in 1937.

== Personal life ==
=== Marriages, children and family ===
Arlin was married three times. His first wife was Emily Pace. Pace was born in 1897 to Arthur Pace and Emily (née Riley) in McKeesport, Pennsylvania. Arlin and Pace were married in 1920 and had three children together; Ralph Wampler Arlin (October 13, 1921–June 25, 2006), Edward Arlin and Dorothy Hershey. The two remained married for 34 years until Pace's death at age 56 on September 14, 1954. His second marriage was to Neva Ray Brown who died in 1982. His third marriage was to Ida Lee Dean. They were married sometime in the early 1980s and remained so until Arlin's death.

Edward S. "Ed" Arlin was born on July 8, 1924, in Pittsburgh. He graduated from Mansfield Senior High School in 1942, served as an Ensign in the United States Navy during World War II before returning home and graduating from the University of Cincinnati. Ed Arlin was also a member of the 1946 University of Georgia National Football Championship team. Ed retired from Portage Electric Products of North Canton, Ohio, and was a former partner and co-founder of Norwalk Thermostat in Norwalk, Ohio, where he moved to in 1958. Arlin was married for 60 years to E. Joan Beard and the two had six children. Ed Arlin died on November 12, 2011, age 87 at the Fisher-Titus Medical Center in Norwalk.

Dorothy Hershey was born Dorothy Arlin on April 7, 1926, in Mansfield. Like her brothers, Hershey graduated from Mansfield Senior High School. She later attended and graduated from Miami University. She was employed by Norwalk City Schools as a substitute teacher in the late 1950s and was head of the drapery department at Hills Interiors in Norwalk from 1960 to 1980. Hershey was a member of the Girl Scouts of the United States of America (GSUSA) for 80 years, serving as the Norwalk Girl Scout neighborhood chairman from 1956 to 1968. She was also a member of the Norwalk First United Methodist Church. Hershey was married for 55 years to Howard A. Hershey, the athletic director at Norwalk High School, who preceded her in death. The Hersheys had two children together; Lura Magi and David Hershey. Hershey died on October 13, 2013, at Stein Hospice Care Center in Sandusky, Ohio.

Arlin's grandson Steven Ralph Arlin, more commonly known as Steve Arlin, is a former professional baseball player, a major league pitcher with the San Diego Padres and Cleveland Indians for six seasons from 1969 to 1974.

=== 1952 presidential election ===
On November 4, 1952, Arlin temporarily returned to radio, announcing his first radio broadcast in twenty-seven years. The broadcast was sponsored by Westinghouse, Arlin's former employer, and was the results from the presidential election held that day between former General Dwight D. Eisenhower and former Illinois Governor Adlai Stevenson. Like the Harding-Cox election returns 32 years before, Arlin read the results over the air to an entire nation of listeners. Republican Eisenhower won the election and was President of the United States until 1961.

=== Pirates vs. Padres baseball game ===
On August 30, 1972, Arlin announced his first professional baseball game in more than 50 years. The game was between the Pirates and the Padres at Three Rivers Stadium. Arlin's grandson Steve was pitcher for the Padres at this time. Announcer Bob Prince invited Arlin to come back to the broadcasting booth. Prince and Arlin announced the game together as the Padres won. For announcing the game, Arlin received a certificate and a pair of shoes which, according to his grandson Steve, "...he wore [them] all the time."

== Death ==
Arlin and his third wife Ida Lee split their time between Norwalk, where they lived during the warm months and Bakersfield, California, where they lived during the winter months. Arlin was in Bakersfield when he suffered a major heart attack on March 2, 1986. He spent ten days in a Bakersfield hospital until he was discharged on March 12. Arlin returned to his winter home where he died of complications on March 14. Arlin was 90 years old.

Arlin was buried next to first wife Emily on March 19 in Mansfield Cemetery, Mansfield, Ohio.

Arlin Field in Mansfield is named in his honor.
