= Greg Brown (sportscaster) =

American sportscaster

Greg Brown is an American sportscaster, born in Washington, D.C., who has worked as a play-by-play announcer for the Pittsburgh Pirates on SportsNet Pittsburgh and KDKA-FM since 1994. He works with Bob Walk, Neil Walker, Matt Capps, Kevin Young, and John Wehner. Originally, Brown called games with Lanny Frattare until Frattare retired after the 2008 season.

Brown grew up in Mechanicsburg, Pennsylvania. He became a Pirates fan through the broadcasts on KDKA radio and would visit Pittsburgh each summer with his parents to see baseball games at Three Rivers Stadium. Brown enrolled at Point Park College and landed an internship with the Pirates' promotion department in 1979, where his duties included serving as the inaugural backup Pirate Parrot. (The Pirates would go on to win the World Series that year.) He then worked in the Pirates' front office for 10 years in a variety of roles for the sales, broadcasting and public relations departments. He was the public address announcer in 1987 and did weekend sports anchoring at WFMJ-TV in Youngstown, Ohio in 1988.

Brown spent five seasons (1989–93) doing play-by-play for the Pirates' Class AAA affiliate Buffalo Bisons. He also hosted a sports talk show on WGR radio. For three seasons (1991–93), Brown was the color analyst on Buffalo Bills radio broadcasts and also hosted pre-game and post-game shows for the Bills games. (The Bills would advance to the Super Bowl in each of Brown's three seasons as a broadcaster.) He also called basketball games for the Buffalo Bulls.

Brown is known for his call "Raise the Jolly Roger" after every Pirates victory. This is keeping in line with Pirate broadcasters, such as Lanny Frattare and Bob Prince, who also ended each Pirate win with a distinctive statement ("We had 'em all the way!" for Prince and "There was no doubt about it!" for Frattare). He is also known to exclaim "Clear the deck, cannonball coming!" on home runs hit by the Pirates, as well as "It's a trip-trip-triple!" when Pirates players hit triples.

A report by Minnesota-based Bring Me The News declared Brown the "losingest" active play by play announcer in MLB. At the time of the article, Brown had called 2,133 losses by the Pirates, with a .454 winning percentage.

Brown and his wife Kim have one son, Ryan.

== See also ==
- Pittsburgh Pirates broadcasters and media

Preceded by Pete Weber	Buffalo Bills color commentator 1990–1993	Succeeded by John Murphy
