= Rosey Rowswell =

American poet

- Born: Albert Kennedy Rowswell; February 1, 1884; Alton, Illinois, US
- Died: February 6, 1955 (aged 71); Pittsburgh, Pennsylvania, US
- Occupation: Sportscaster
- Years active: 1936–1954
- Organization: Pittsburgh Pirates

Albert Kennedy "Rosey" Rowswell (February 1, 1884 – February 6, 1955) was an American radio sportscaster, best known for being the first full-time play-by-play announcer for the Pittsburgh Pirates Major League Baseball club, for whom he worked exclusively during 19 consecutive seasons. Rowswell was affectionately dubbed "Rosey" by baseball people and revering fans alike.

Born in Alton, Illinois, Rowswell was raised in Tarentum, Pennsylvania, where he developed a passion for baseball.

== Early career ==
Rowswell, whose previous occupation was as a secretary at Pittsburgh's Third Presbyterian Church, began his broadcasting career in the first decade of the 20th century as announcer on a network program. He joined the Pittsburgh broadcasting staff from 1933 through 1935, until becoming the distinctive voice of the Pirates in its 1936 season. He stayed with the team for the rest of his life, delivering the games with a gaudy yet completely infusive and cheerful style that became familiar to Pirates listeners through the WWSW and KDKA airwaves.

The hiring of Rowswell was based on his ability as an after dinner speaker, which gained him a reputation in that area, as well as for his notorious prestige as the Pirates number one fan. At this point, he had not missed a Pirates home game since the 1909 season and even traveled with the team. In recognition of his support and loyalty to the team, the 1925 World Series Champion Pirates presented to him a gold baseball charm as a reward for his unconditional support. For Rosie, the Pirates were his "Picaroonies" and he worshiped the home team as if they were his extended family. There was genuine affection for a generally helpless franchise.

But after being hired by the Pirates, Rowswell did not travel with the team for road games. He stayed in Pittsburgh and recreated the game action, wholeheartedly, after it came in over the Western Union service, usually an inning or so behind. The game action was sent from the remote location using a short code that was printed on a paper tape. The tape was then passed to the sportscaster who then elaborated on the information and sound effects were added by the studio engineer. Rosey was an energetic person who covered the Pirates and blew a slide whistle for every home run. His response was “open the window Aunt Minney, here she comes.” Once he did a recreation of a Saturday double header that went into extra innings. It was just Rosey and the Western Union man in the studio, but one would think the setting was in the middle of Forbes Field. Rosey was along in years by this time, and one worried that he might not make it through the broadcast. While most of his early broadcasts were solo, he was eventually joined by his future successor Bob Prince and the then Pirates co-owner Bing Crosby.

Rowswell, who always called the Pirates "Buccos", also developed a colorful language pattern to describe a wide variety of plays.

== Pet expressions ==
He gained notoriety for his pet expressions such "a doozie maroonie", when a Pirate slapped an extra-base hit; the "o-o-l-l-ld dipsy doodle" to remark a breaking pitch that caused a rival batter to strike out, and "put 'em on and take 'em off" to describe a double play. Then, when Pittsburgh was able to load the bases, he would use the phrase "They're F.O.B." (full of Bucs). On other occasions, in case the rival team put on a hitting display, or the Pirates lost the game, he moaned deeply: "Oh!, my achin' back."

But perhaps his most memorable expression came when a Pirate belted a home run. In lieu of a simple "It's outta here", "Going. . . going . . . gone," or some trite statement, Rowswell called upon a mythical relative created by him, and shouted "Raise the window, Aunt Minnie. Here it comes, right into your petunia patch! Then came a sound effect of a big crash like the sound of a window breaking. "That's too bad," Rosey cried. "Aunt Minnie never made it in time."

Sometimes Rowswell carried a slide whistle and, whenever a member of the Pirates connected on a pitch, he would blow on the whistle and say "Hurry up, Aunt Minnie; raise the window! At that point, his fellow broadcaster Bob Prince would drop a tray filled with an assortment of noise makers to the ground to simulate the smashing of Aunt Minnie's window.

Rowswell made no attempt to hide his unconditional love for the Pirates. In fact, during one of his one-sided broadcasts he prompted Judge Kenesaw Mountain Landis, then commissioner of baseball, to express of him: "Why, they tell me there are people living in Pittsburgh who don't even know the names of the other seven teams in the National League". To wit, he replied: "Judge, I just try to educate the fans to love the Pirates as much as I do". He also was very active in community affairs and would give on-air birthday wishes to his loyal fans.

== Writings ==
Rowswell was also an author who published several volumes of verse which were widely circulated. His sentimental, optimistic poems were in the same vein as the light verse of Nick Kenny and Edgar Guest, who wrote syndicated columns in the early 20th century. His best known work was Should You Go First, an emotional ode dedicated to his wife. Having established himself as a respected after dinner speaker, he enhanced his inspirational talks with poems of his own and selected anecdotes. He usually concluded the evening with an opportunity for members of the audience to raise questions.

Rosie Rowswell died in Pittsburgh, just five days after his 71st birthday. At the time of his death from uremic poisoning, he was planning to join the Pirates in their Bradenton, Florida spring training camp in preparation for his 20th season of broadcasting. He is buried at Allegheny Cemetery in Pittsburgh.

== See also ==
- List of Pittsburgh Pirates broadcasters
