= Nellie King =

American baseball player (1928–2010)

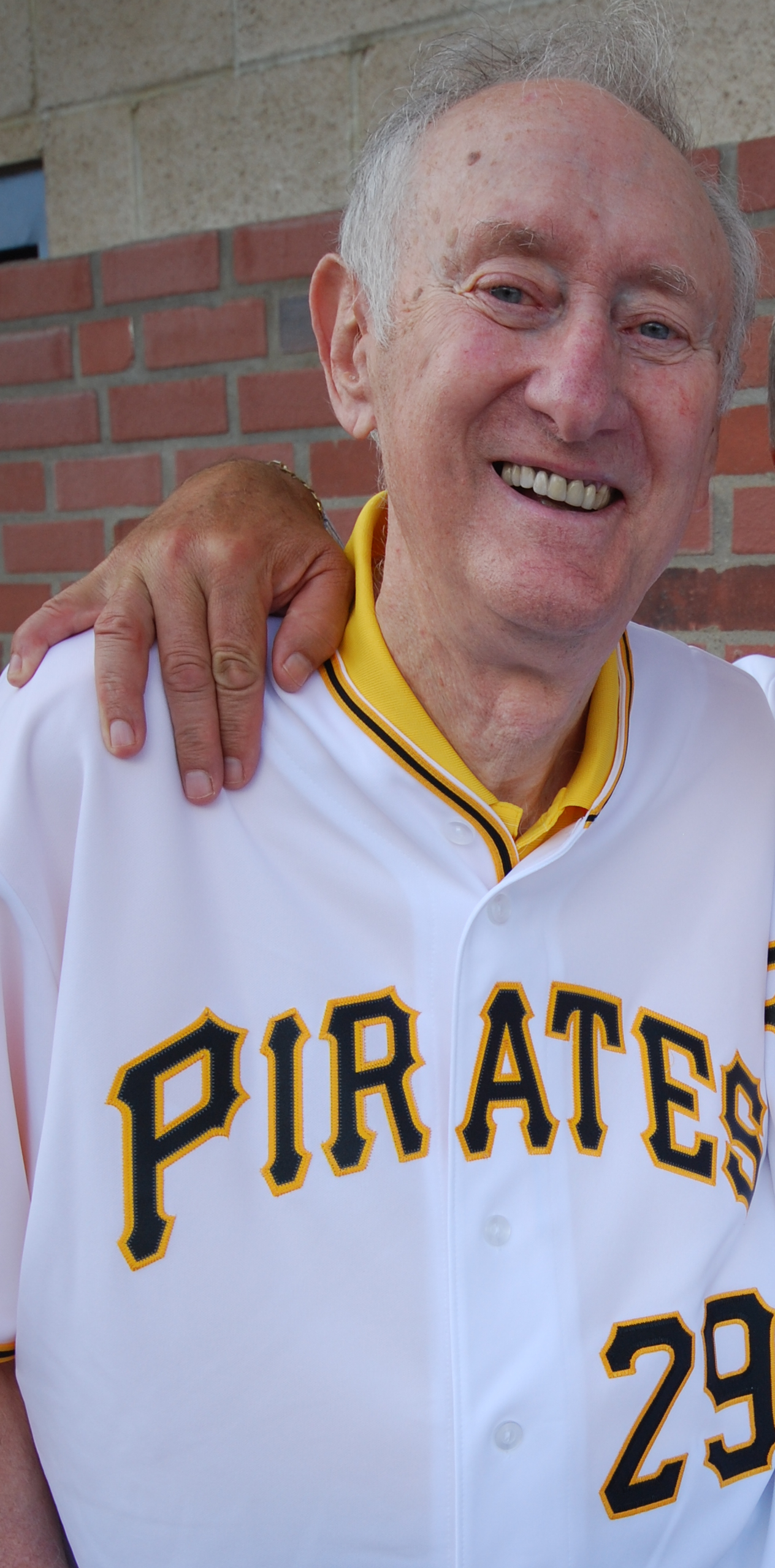
- King in 2009
- Pitcher
- Born: March 15, 1928; Shenandoah, Pennsylvania, U.S.
- Died: August 11, 2010 (aged 82); Mount Lebanon, Pennsylvania, U.S.
- Batted: Right Threw: Right

MLB debut
- April 15, 1954, for the Pittsburgh Pirates

Last MLB appearance
- September 15, 1957, for the Pittsburgh Pirates

MLB statistics
- Win–loss record: 7–5
- Earned run average: 3.58
- Strikeouts: 72
- Stats at Baseball Reference

Teams
- Pittsburgh Pirates (1954–1957)

Nelson Joseph King (March 15, 1928 – August 11, 2010) was an American professional baseball pitcher for the Pittsburgh Pirates, and later a member of the Pirates' radio announcing team with Bob Prince. Listed at 6 ft 6 in (1.98 m) in height, and weighing 185 lb (84 kg), King batted and threw right-handed.

== Early life ==
In 1936, three years after the death of his father during the height of the Depression, King was sent to board at the Hershey Industrial School in Hershey, Pennsylvania. The school was originally established for impoverished, healthy, male orphans who lived in and worked on Milton Hershey's farm homes and attended school until their graduation. It was here that Nellie learned a vocation, the love of God and man, and wholesome responsibility.

== Baseball career ==
King pitched in the National League from 1954 through 1957 for the Pittsburgh Pirates. He finished his career with a 7–5 record and appeared in 95 games, all but four in relief. King was originally signed by the St. Louis Cardinals as an amateur free agent in 1946; however, he was traded to the Pirates after the 1948 season. As a batter, King holds the major league record for most plate appearances (29) without reaching base.

== Broadcasting career ==
After selling municipal bonds following his retirement from baseball, King moved into sports broadcasting in 1959 for radio stations in Greensburg and Latrobe, both small cities near Pittsburgh. He was hired as the third member of the Pirates' broadcasting team for the 1967 season, joining Bob Prince and Jim Woods. King replaced Don Hoak, who had moved back onto the field as a major league coach. Woods left the Pirates after the 1969 season and was replaced by Gene Osborn. When Osborn was fired after one year, the Pirates went with a two-man team, Prince and King.

The broadcasting duo remained in place until 1975, when Prince and King were told their contracts would not be renewed. Prince had issues with management at KDKA, which held the broadcast rights. King was swept out in the station's desire to start with a completely new team. The Pirates offered King a job heading the team's speakers bureau, but he declined. He was hired as sports information director at Duquesne University, and started a career that lasted more than 20 years at the university. King also served as color commentator on Duquesne basketball broadcasts and coached the golf team from 1988 until 2004.

King continued to do freelance broadcasting work and was employed by various radio stations, including KDKA, WWSW, WEEP, WTAE, and WEDO. He also served as color analyst on radio broadcasts of Carnegie Mellon Tartans football.

King returned to the Pirates' broadcast booth as a guest commentator for a game in the final season at Three Rivers Stadium on October 1, 2000. In 2009, he published a book titled Happiness Is Like A Cur Dog: The Thirty-Year Journey of a Major League Baseball Pitcher and Broadcaster.

== Personal life ==
King and his wife, Bernadette (d. June 17, 2017), had three daughters and two grandchildren. On August 11, 2010, King died from Parkinson's disease.
