= Walter E. Sickles =

American television presenter of children's programming

- Born: February 13, 1908; Altoona, Pennsylvania
- Died: February 11, 1997 (aged 88); Lockhart, Florida
- Occupations: Television and radio host, narrator, and teacher

Walter E. Sickles (February 13, 1908 – February 11, 1997), also known as Uncle Walt, was an American children's television host, singer, producer and programming director at Way Down By Orlando (WDBO), now WKMG-TV, the first local television station in Orlando, Florida. His program, Adventures with Uncle Walt, which aired on WDBO from 1954 to 1967, was a popular local, afternoon children’s program.

== Early life and military service ==
Walter E. Sickles was born February 13, 1908, in Altoona, Pennsylvania. At 12 years old, he sang a solo at the Pennsylvania governor's inauguration on the steps of the State Capitol in Harrisburg. He was a boy soprano and soloist for the choir at St. Stephen's Episcopal Church. In the 1930s, he and his sister Lola Blackburn hosted a radio program, titled Jack and Jill, on WWSW.

By the 1940s, Sickles was program director at WWSW. In September 1942, he was narrator of Industry Presents, a radio series with Bill Cullen profiling industrial plants in Pittsburgh which were contributing to the war effort. He also served in World War II and returned to Pittsburgh following VE Day.

== Career ==
In his youth before and after World War II, Sickles was a radio announcer in Pittsburgh. In 1950, he moved to Florida to pursue a career in radio and television. Sickles started Adventures with Uncle Walt on WHOO, a radio station in Orlando, Florida. He played host to events such as Central Florida Symphony Orchestra which performed at the Municipal Auditorium in Orlando.

Way Down By Orlando (WDBO), now WKMG-TV, offered him the position of programming director and host of a children's program for the station which would soon launch. On July 1, 1954, on the first day of broadcasting for WDBO, Adventures with Uncle Walt began airing at 5 p.m. every weekday. WDBO was an affiliate of CBS.

Adventures with Uncle Walt featured segments like Crusader Rabbit, Flash Gordon, and Felix the Cat. However, the biggest attraction to the show was the live interviews with children, which attracted about 53,000 participants over its lifetime. Sickles would feature on his program children who had written to him by mail. The children would be given a snack or drink from one of the sponsors, either a glass of milk from T. G. Lee Dairy or a hot dog from Tarnow Sausage.

On February 27, 1967, Sickles was fired by the station just moments before he was due to appear on his program. After 13 years with WDBO, Adventures with Uncle Walt was taken off air. Sickles subsequently became a teacher in Orange County Public Schools. He retired after teaching for 11 years. However, he continued to appear in radio commercials with his voice appearing as narrator for commercials for political candidates and companies like Pizza Hut, as well as voice-overs for Smithsonian documentaries.

== Personal life and death ==
Sickles had a son, Walter Jr., from his first marriage which ended several years before his service in World War II. He married Georgene before the war and they started a family after his return. They had two sons, Richard and Robin. Georgene played a pivotal role in the making of Adventures with Uncle Walt, managing birthday lists and coordinating with the show’s sponsors to send birthday cards to kids. She also became a kindergarten and first grade teacher in Orange County Public Schools.

Sickles eventually retired to Cypress Hill Ranch near Lockhart, Florida. He died on February 11, 1997, two days before his 89th birthday. A memorial service was held on February 14 in Winter Park, Florida.
