= John Wehner =

American baseball player (born 1967)

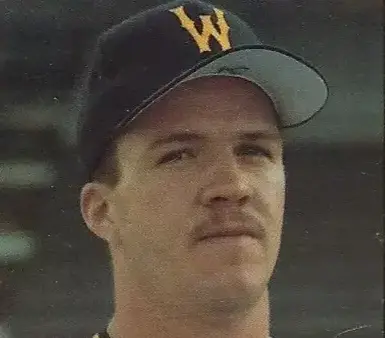
- Wehner with the Watertown Pirates c. 1988
- Third baseman / Outfielder
- Born: June 29, 1967 (age 58); Pittsburgh, Pennsylvania, U.S.
- Batted: Right Threw: Right

MLB debut
- July 17, 1991, for the Pittsburgh Pirates

Last MLB appearance
- July 27, 2001, for the Pittsburgh Pirates

MLB statistics
- Batting average: .249
- Home runs: 4
- Runs batted in: 54
- Stats at Baseball Reference

Teams
- Pittsburgh Pirates (1991–1996); Florida Marlins (1997–1998); Pittsburgh Pirates (1999–2001)

Career highlights and awards
- World Series champion (1997)

John Paul Wehner (pronounced "Way-ner") (born June 29, 1967) is an American former utility player in Major League Baseball (MLB) and a current broadcaster for the Pittsburgh Pirates. His nickname is "Rock".

== Career ==
A Pittsburgh native and graduate of Carrick High School, Wehner was drafted out of Indiana University by the Pirates in the 7th round of the 1988 MLB draft and made his MLB debut on July 17, 1991. He was in the Pirates' organization, splitting his time between MLB and their minor league affiliates, through the 1996 season. In 1997 he joined the Florida Marlins as a bench player, staying there for two seasons before rejoining the Pirates in 1999.

He retired from playing in 2001. He is known for hitting the final home run (in the bottom of the 5th), and also grounding into the final out in the history of Three Rivers Stadium, both on October 1, 2000. In 11 seasons in MLB, Wehner compiled a .249 batting average with four home runs and 54 RBI in 461 games. He played every position except pitcher at least 3 times. He also shares the MLB record of 99 consecutive errorless games at third base with Jeff Cirillo and has a World Series ring with the Florida Marlins for the 1997 season.

== Broadcasting ==
After retiring from playing, Wehner took a job as hitting coach for the Altoona Curve, a Pirates minor league affiliate, and held that position from 2002 through 2004. In 2005 he began working as a color commentator for AT&T SportsNet Pittsburgh and the Pirates Radio Network.

== See also ==
- Pittsburgh Pirates broadcasters and media
