= Bob Prince =

American sportscaster (1916–1985)

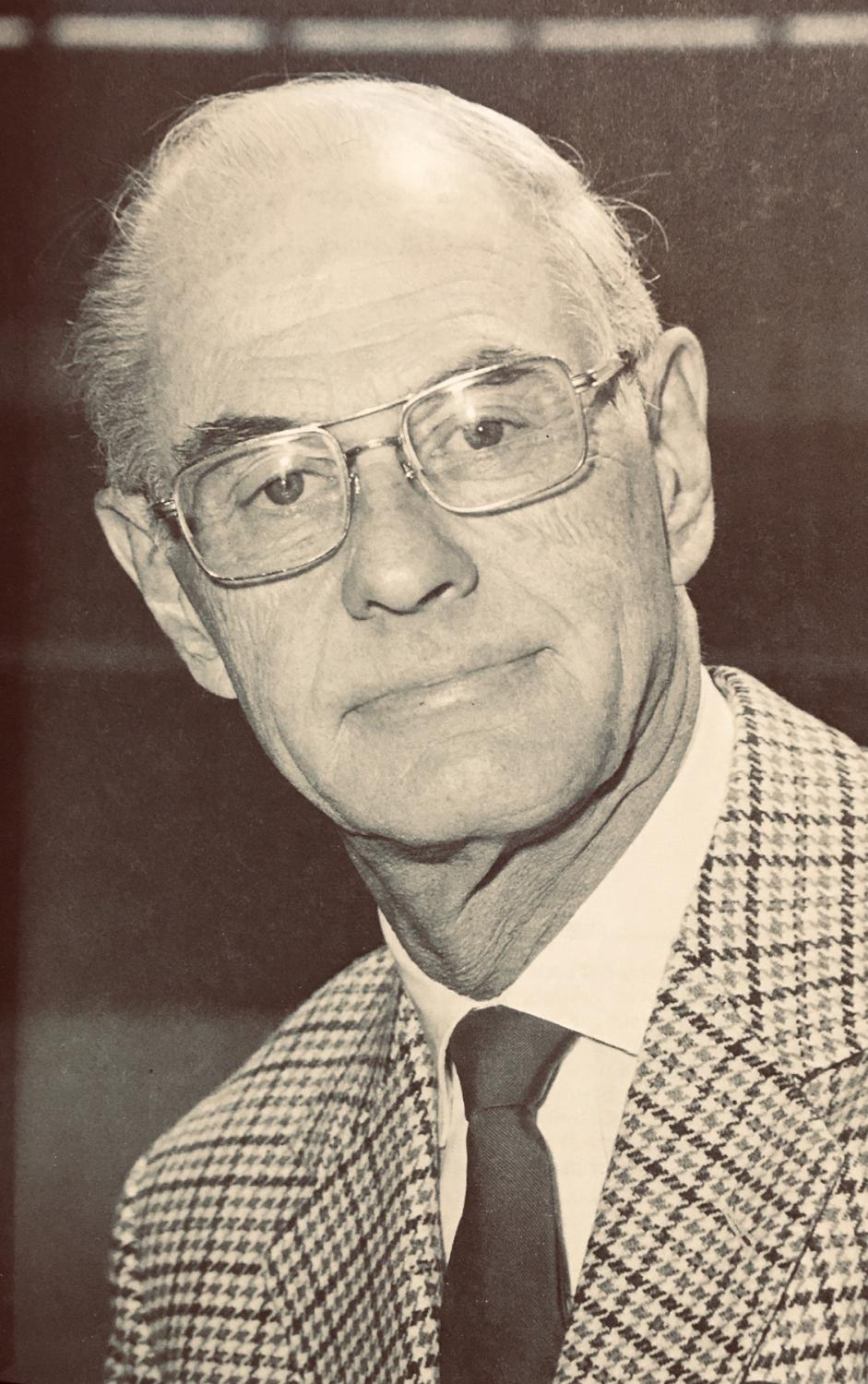
- Bob Prince
- Born: Robert Ferris Prince; July 1, 1916; Los Angeles, California, U.S.
- Died: June 10, 1985 (aged 68); Pittsburgh, Pennsylvania, U.S.
- Resting place: Westminster Presbyterian Church Columbarium, Pittsburgh, Pennsylvania
- Other name: The Gunner
- Education: University of Pittsburgh
- Occupation: Sportscaster
- Years active: 1948–1985

Robert Ferris Prince (July 1, 1916 – June 10, 1985) was an American radio and television sportscaster and commentator, renowned for his 28-year stint as the voice of Major League Baseball's Pittsburgh Pirates, with whom he earned the nickname "The Gunner" and became a cultural icon in Pittsburgh.

Prince called Pirates games from 1948 to 1975, including the World Series championship years of 1960 and 1971. Nationally, he broadcast the 1960, 1966, and 1971 World Series and the 1965 All-Star Game for NBC, as well as the first season (1976) of ABC's Monday Night Baseball. He also broadcast at different times for other Pittsburgh-area sports teams, including the Pittsburgh Steelers and the Pittsburgh Penguins.

Prince was known for his garish sports coats, unabashed approach, rapid-fire delivery, deep, gravelly voice, and clever nicknames and phrases, which came to be known as "Gunnerisms". His unique style influenced numerous broadcasters after him, including Pirates successors Lanny Frattare and Greg Brown as well as Penguins voice Mike Lange and Steelers color analyst Myron Cope.

== Early life and career ==
Born in Los Angeles, California, Prince was the son of a former West Point football player and career military man. An Army brat himself, Prince attended several schools before graduation from Schenley High School in Pittsburgh. As an athlete, he lettered in swimming at the University of Pittsburgh.

Prince got his start at radio station WJAS before he landed a sports show on KDKA-TV. Prince joined Rosey Rowswell in the Pirates broadcast booth as a commentator in 1948 and was promoted to the top spot shortly after Rowswell's death in February 1955. He also broadcast Pittsburgh Steelers and Penn State football, Pittsburgh Hornets hockey and a Duquesne basketball game in the 1950s.

For three decades, Prince was a fixture of team broadcasts on KDKA-AM, a clear-channel station whose 50,000 watts and non-directional transmitter provided him and the Pirates with a vast radio audience. In daylight hours, it could be heard throughout central and western Pennsylvania as well as portions of the adjacent states of Ohio, West Virginia and Maryland. Barring inclement weather, it also was audible in far western New York State and the southernmost part of the Canadian province of Ontario. After sunset, Prince's voice could be heard across much of the Eastern and Midwestern United States as well as Eastern Canada.

Known for his countless hours of charitable work in the community, Prince was an omnipresent figure on the banquet circuit and at team functions. One of his more publicized works came in the 1971 World Series, when Pirates rookie Bruce Kison was scheduled to be married on what turned out to be the day of the seventh and final game. In exchange for World Series tickets, Prince made arrangements for a private jet that allowed the pitcher to attend his wedding on time.

=== The Possum and The Gunner ===
Many critics believed Prince and longtime sidekick Jim "The Possum" Woods did their best work while paired together in the 1958 through 1969 seasons, a period that coincided with the rise of the Pirates to contender status. It was roughly halfway through Woods's debut season when Prince, inspired by the team's marked improvement after nearly a decade in the National League's second division, began to call Forbes Field "The House of Thrills". It was Woods who first referred to his partner as "The Gunner", some said because of Prince's staccato style. Others claimed it was the result of an incident with a jealous, gun-toting husband. Woods allegedly recounted to an interviewer in Cleveland that, during his first spring training with the Pirates in Fort Myers, Florida in 1958, Prince had had a narrow escape from an encounter with a jealous husband who was packing a gun.

Prince's “excited voice” was a component of his announcing that earned him the loyalty of Pirates fans. His cleverness influenced Woods' style as well, and by the mid-1960s, The Possum was announcing the presence of pinch hitter and reserve catcher Jesse Gonder with, "Let's go up yonder with Jesse Gonder." The two continued working together through the 1969 season, after which the flagship station KDKA refused to match a higher salary offer from KMOX in St. Louis for Woods to join Jack Buck in the St. Louis Cardinals' booth, a partnership that would last two seasons.

Prince was reunited with Woods on two separate occasions for the USA Network. The first was on July 26, 1979, for a game between the Pirates and the Cincinnati Reds in Pittsburgh. The second occasion was on August 28, 1980, for another Pirates game in Pittsburgh against the Reds.

=== 'Gunnerisms' ===
During his career, Prince coined numerous terms and catch phrases that became part of his on-air lexicon. Some of the most often used:

- "Alabaster blast": batted ball that bounced unusually high off the notoriously hard Forbes Field infield surface.
- "Bloop and a blast": single followed by a home run, the cure for a two-run deficit.
- "Bug on a rug": ball that rolled quickly in the outfield on artificial turf.
- "Can o' corn": routine fly ball.
- "Dying quail": softly hit ball that fell safely in the outfield.
- "Chicken on The Hill with Will": a Willie Stargell home run, for which complimentary food was given to customers at his eatery in the Hill district in Pittsburgh.
- "Fuzz on a tick's ear": small margin of success or failure.
- "Good night, Mary Edgerley, wherever you are . . .": declaration after a Pirates victory, a fictitious spin-off of comedian Jimmy Durante's signature tribute to Mrs. Calabash, his first wife.
- "Hoover": a double play, as in having vacuumed the bases clean. Once completed, it was often followed by "Pull out the plug, mother."
- "House of Thrills": Forbes Field, home of the Pirates.
- "Peel and eat it": the only option for the defender on a bunt or slow roller on which he has no play.
- "Radio ball": fastball that could be heard but not seen.
- "We had 'em alllll the way!": brief summation of a close victory that was much in doubt until the final pitch.
- "You can kiss it goodbye!": a home run

=== The Green Weenie ===
In 1966, Prince popularized a good-luck charm known as the Green Weenie, a green plastic rattle that resembled an oversized pickle. Fans would parade a giant replica of the Green Weenie through the grandstand to jinx opponents, and Prince would point an original toward the field to do likewise. The shape and color were derived from the pickle-shaped pins distributed to schoolchildren when they toured the H. J. Heinz Company factory in Pittsburgh. Tens of thousands of Green Weenies were sold in its lifetime, but because the souvenirs were not trademarked, no one in the organization profited from them.

Prince came up with the idea when he saw Pirates trainer Danny Whelan wave a Green Weenie while he yelled at Houston Astros pitcher Dave Giusti to walk a batter. Guisti obliged, the Pirates went on to win the game and soon Prince began to talk about its mystical powers on broadcasts. "Never underestimate the power of the Green Weenie," he liked to remind his listeners. In 1966, the height of its popularity, Prince often punctuated the final out of a victory with, "The great Green Weenie has done it again!"

Even when the Green Weenie failed to produce immediate results, it could have a positive effect just the same. In one June game, Prince pointed it towards San Francisco Giants pitcher Juan Marichal, but the attempt couldn't prevent a 2-1 loss. When the Giants ace had the middle finger of his pitching hand crushed in a car door the next day, however, he was forced to skip his next start then dropped two of three upon his return.

By late season, the Pirates were locked in a tense National League pennant race with the Dodgers and Giants. They lost their final three games of the season to finish in third place with a 92-70 record, three games behind the Los Angeles Dodgers. The silver lining for Pirates die-hards was that the Giants finished a close second, and they liked to think the Green Weenie-induced injury to Marichal made the difference.

== Later career ==
=== Controversial departure ===
Soon after control of the broadcasts changed from Atlantic Richfield to Westinghouse Broadcasting in 1969, Prince had personal conflicts with Westinghouse management. Pirates management often interceded to quell tensions between Prince and KDKA executives. In 1975, Prince and sidekick Nellie King were fired, a decision that Pirates management did not try to reverse, with regional director of Westinghouse Broadcasting Ed Wallis being labeled as the public target for fans to draw their ire. Pirates fans were shocked by the news. Egged on by competing radio station WEEP, hundreds of supporters held a parade and downtown rally. Several Pirates players also went to bat for him, but rehiring Prince was never a consideration.

KDKA hired Milo Hamilton in December and distributed press kits at a news conference that had a cover sticker proclaiming, "The New Voice of the Pirates." Hamilton was never popular with fans, later accusing Prince of badmouthing him and being "bitter" about this departure. After the 1979 season, Hamilton left the team, calling the experience "living hell”. Lanny Frattare avoided the implied negativism toward Prince and worked as Hamilton's junior partner and occasional play-by-play man. He went on to broadcast Pirates games with almost universal acceptance until 2008.

After his time with the Pirates, Prince had stints calling Houston Astros baseball in 1976, Pittsburgh Penguins hockey, and ABC's Monday Night Baseball. On ABC, he was partnered with Warner Wolf and Bob Uecker. Prince was frustrated that ABC would not let him employ his usual style (the network encouraged talking without much personality) and was removed from the primary Monday night broadcast team during his first season (1976) before being dropped altogether after the season. He also was released by the Astros after a one-year stay; he later said that Houston didn't agree with him. His work with the Penguins was a cause of consternation for hockey fans because he didn't understand the game and didn't know the Penguins' personnel. Eventually he was taken off play-by-play and re-cast as an intermission interviewer. Eventually, he returned to Pirate baseball, thrilling his loyal fans, in 1982, calling a limited number of Pirates games for a cable station.

=== Triumphant return ===
Three years after his return, in 1985, KDKA and the Pirates decided to make Prince a member of the regular radio broadcast team. Broadcaster Lanny Frattare suggested that KDKA should launch a campaign to have Prince recognized with the Hall of Fame's Ford Frick Award. At about the same time, independently, station executives Rick Starr and Chris Cross decided Prince should have a role on the radio broadcasts. The announcement came days after he had been released from a hospital for cancer treatments. Prince returned to the Pirates broadcast booth on May 3 to announce the middle three innings of a game between the Pirates and the Los Angeles Dodgers. Weakened from mouth cancer, Prince was able to announce only two innings but was given three standing ovations. In the fourth inning, the first that Prince announced, the Pirates scored nine runs, one for each year of his absence from the booth. In the next inning Prince called for first baseman Jason Thompson to park one "so we'll have a little bit of everything," and Thompson homered; the Pirates won 16–2 to improve to 7–13 (.350).

The 1985 team finished last in the majors at 57–104 (.354). Willie Stargell had retired three years earlier, and most of the 1979 championship team had disbanded. The fourth inning broadcast announced by Prince on May 3 was the fifth-most runs scored in any one inning (9) in Pirates franchise history. A commentator on KDKA-TV (Channel 2) referred to it on the 6 p.m. news as the "last revival of the Green Weenie," Prince's good luck charm from 1966. Prince announced a few following homestands. Weeks later, he reported to the park for another game, but his illness forced him to go home after waiting through a long rain delay. Prince was unable to report for work again and was re-admitted to the hospital, where he died on June 10 at age 68. His brief funeral service on June 16 was attended by seven hundred.

== Honors and awards ==
Prince was posthumously awarded the Ford C. Frick Award by the Baseball Hall of Fame as a broadcaster in 1986. He also was a 1986 inductee in the National Sportscasters and Sportswriters Association Hall of Fame.

Even today, his name remains synonymous with Pirates baseball including the naming of the new "Gunner's Lounge" at PNC Park in 2012. In 1999, Prince was selected for the Pride of the Pirates award, a lifetime achievement honor given annually to a member of the organization.

Media offices
Preceded by Chris Schenkel (in 1965)	Lead play-by-play announcer, Major League Baseball on ABC; 1976	Succeeded by Keith Jackson
