= Crenshaw =

Crenshaw may refer to:

== People ==
- Dan Crenshaw (born 1984), American politician
- Jonathan Crenshaw (1972–2023), an armless painter from Miami
- Kimberlé Crenshaw (born 1959), American legal scholar and activist

== Places in the United States ==
- Crenshaw, Los Angeles
  - Crenshaw High School
- Crenshaw County, Alabama
- Crenshaw, Mississippi
- Crenshaw, Pennsylvania

== Transportation ==
- Crenshaw Boulevard
- Crenshaw station (C Line, Los Angeles Metro)
- Expo/Crenshaw station (E Line, Los Angeles Metro)
- K Line (Los Angeles Metro), known during construction as the Crenshaw/LAX Line

== Other uses ==
- Crenshaw (surname)
- Crenshaw Company, a blockade running company during the American Civil War
- Crenshaw House (disambiguation)
- A type of true melon
- Crenshaw Site, an agreed point of burial mounds in Arkansas
- Crenshaw (mixtape), a 2013 mixtape by rapper Nipsey Hussle
