= Crenshaw (surname) =

Crenshaw is a toponymic surname for people from the Lancashire village of Cranshaw, derived from the Old English words cran(uc) "crane" and sceaga "grove, thicket". Notable people with the surname include:

- Ander Crenshaw (born 1944), American politician
- Anderson Crenshaw (1783–1847), American jurist
- Barclay Crenshaw (born 1971), stage name Claude VonStroke, American music producer
- Ben Crenshaw (born 1952), American professional golfer
- Brandon Crenshaw-Dickson (born 2001), American football player
- Caroline A. Crenshaw, American lawyer
- C. C. Crenshaw (1883–1940), American politician
- Chris Crenshaw (born 1986), American baseball player and coach
- Claude J. Crenshaw (1918–1972), American Air Force officer and flying ace
- Craig Crenshaw (born 1962), American general
- Dan Crenshaw (born 1984), American politician
- Dave Crenshaw (born 1975), American author
- David Crenshaw Barrow Jr. (1852–1929), American professor and administrator
- Evan Crenshaw (born 2004), American football player
- George Crenshaw (born 1960), American racing driver
- George L. Crenshaw (1855–1937), American real estate developer and banker
- George Webster Crenshaw (1913–2007), cartoonist and creator of the comic strip Belvedere
- James L. Crenshaw (born 1934), American Biblical professor
- Jesse Crenshaw (1946–2026), American politician from Kentucky
- John Crenshaw (1797–1871), American landowner and slave trader
- John Bascom Crenshaw (1861–1942), American athlete
- John T. Crenshaw (1820–1863), American soldier
- Jonathan Crenshaw (1972–2023), American artist and homeless man
- Joni Crenshaw (born 1979), American basketball coach
- Kimberlé Crenshaw (born 1959), American lawyer
- Leon Crenshaw (1943–2008), American football player
- Marshall Crenshaw (born 1953), American singer, songwriter and guitarist
- Martha Crenshaw (born 1945), American professor
- Marvin Crenshaw (born 1952), American football player
- Mary Jean Crenshaw Tully (1925–2003), American women's rights activist
- Mary Mayo Crenshaw (1875–1951), American writer
- Matt Crenshaw (born 1978), American basketball player and coach
- Mic Crenshaw (born 1970), American recording artist
- Pauline Smith Crenshaw (1878–1956), American historian and socialite
- Robert Crenshaw, American drummer
- Roberta Crenshaw (1914–2005), American philanthropist
- Walter H. Crenshaw, American politician
- Waverly D. Crenshaw Jr. (born 1956), American judge
- Willis Crenshaw (born 1941), American football player

Fictional characters:

- Peter Crenshaw, a character from the Three Investigators juvenile detective book series
- David Crenshaw, player character of Tom Clancy's H.A.W.X
- Mindy Crenshaw, fictional character on the American sitcom Drake & Josh

== See also ==
- Cranshaw
