= Oscar Randolph Fladmark =

American fighter pilot (1922–1955)

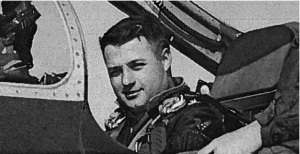
- Born: Oscar Randolph Fladmark; June 23, 1922; Lincoln County, South Dakota
- Died: July 27, 1955 (aged 33) Naval Medical Center San Diego; San Diego, California
- Buried: Hills of Rest Memorial Park
- Branch: United States Army Air Corps; South Dakota Air National Guard; United States Air Force
- Service years: 1942–1945 (USAAC); 1946–1950 (SDANG); 1950–1955 (USAF)
- Rank: Captain (USAAC); Major (USAF); Colonel (SDANG)
- Awards: Distinguished Flying Cross; Air Medal (10); Mach Buster's Club Award (Speed of Sound Citation)
- Spouse: Phyllis Fladmark

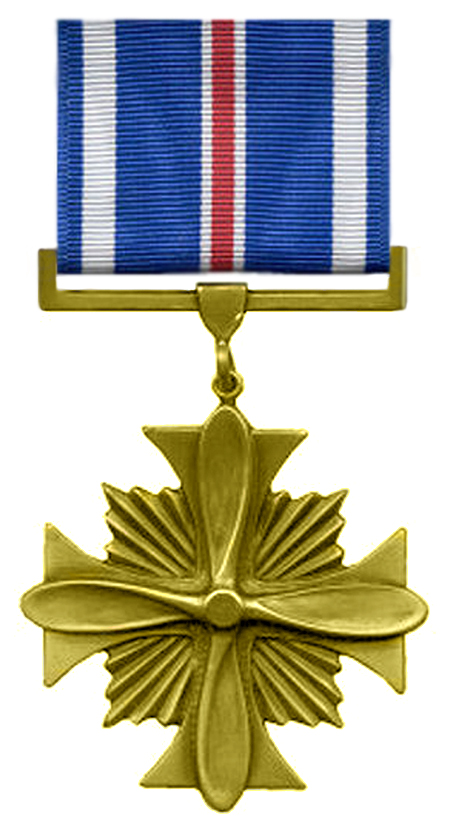
Distinguished Flying Cross (United States)

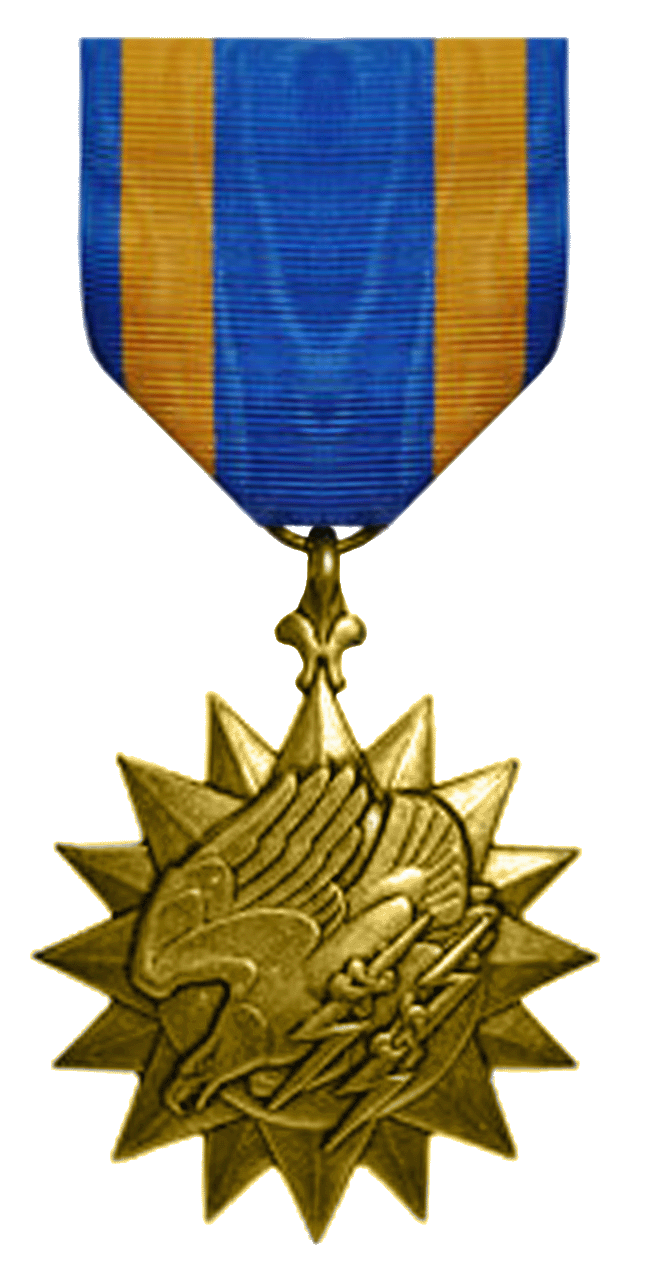
Air Medal

Oscar Randolph Fladmark Jr. (June 23, 1922 – July 27, 1955) was an American fighter pilot who flew 164 "no-injury" combat missions in World War II and the Korean War. Fladmark received the Distinguished Flying Cross during his military career. Just a few years after the Korean War, Major Fladmark, at 33 years of age, was in an automobile accident near Yuma, Arizona, on July 27, 1955, and died while being flown to the San Diego Naval Hospital.

== Early life and education ==
Fladmark was born in Moe Township, Lincoln County, South Dakota, on June 23, 1922. His father, Oscar C. Fladmark Sr. (1888–1965), came from Ålesund, Norway, located on the western coastal fjord region of the country, and had moved to South Dakota in 1907. His mother, Pethryn Hanson (1896–1998), was also of Scandinavian descent and came from Hudson, South Dakota. He had one younger sibling, Lorentz W. Fladmark (1926–1993).

Fladmark attended school in Canton, South Dakota. He was active in sports and became captain of his high school football team. Later, the family relocated to Sioux Falls, South Dakota. He attended Augustana College starting in fall 1940 but his education was interrupted by World War II when he was inducted into the Army Air Corps as an Aviator in June 1942.

== Military career ==
=== World War II ===
During World War II, Fladmark was selected as an aviation cadet and to undergo training with the United States Army Air Corps. He trained at various military bases in California, Arizona, Texas, Florida and Virginia. He was inducted in June 1942 and was commissioned a second lieutenant and received his wings in the United States Army Air Corps in April 1943.

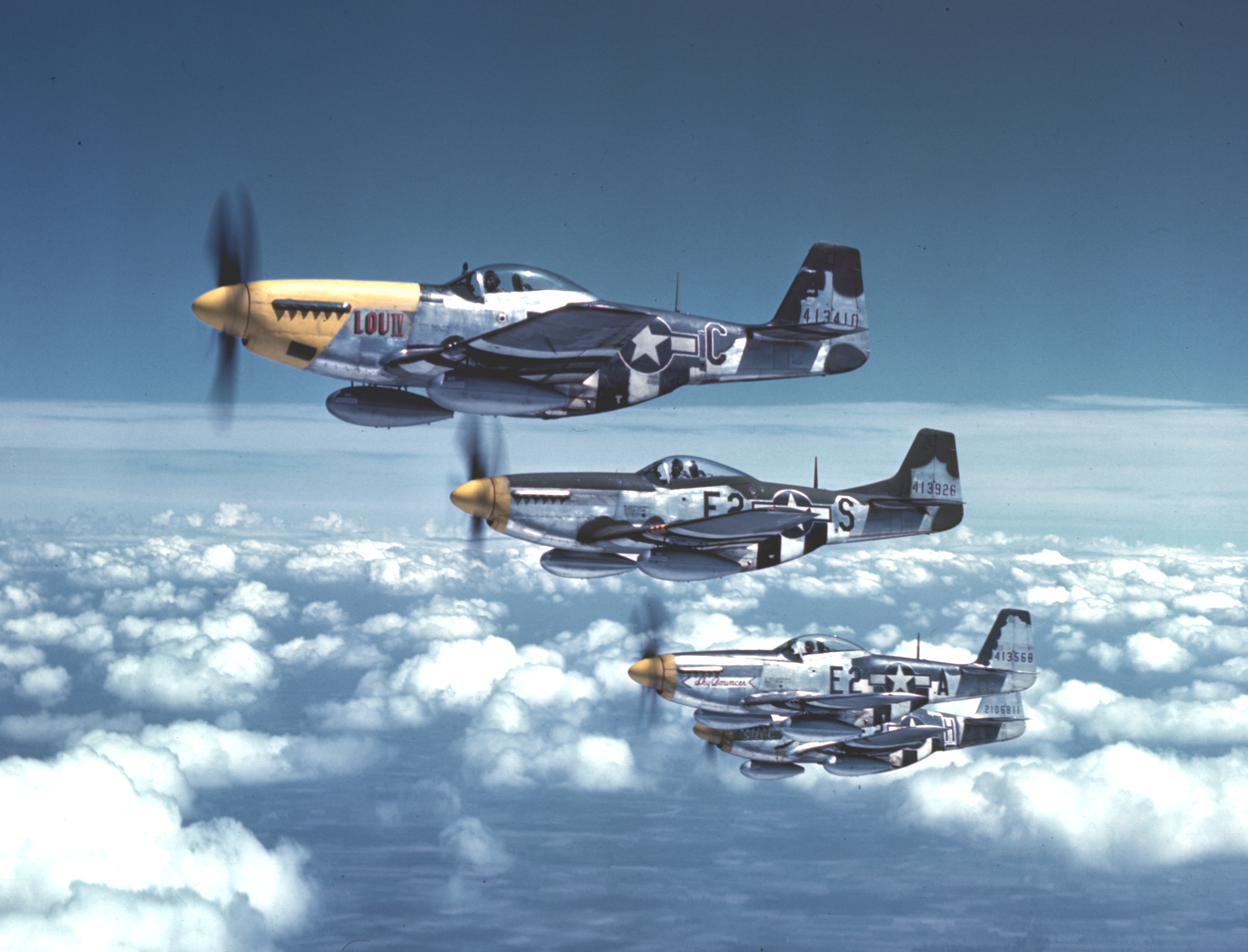
North American P-51 Mustangs of the 375th Fighter Squadron, 361st FG, Summer 1944

He was transferred to the European Theater of Operations (ETO) in England on August 20, 1943, for active duty with the 8th Air Force. Fladmark flew combat missions with the 359th Fighter Group, commanded by Colonel Avelin P. Tacon Jr. and based at the RAF station in East Wretham, England. Initially, the group flew the P-47 Thunderbolt fighter, which was later replaced by the P-51 Mustang fighter. Fladmark flew combat mission strikes over Munich, Saarbrücken, Regensburg, Schweinfurt, Ebelsbach, Neuaubing, Hanover, Normandy, Méry-la-Bataille, Oise River, Sens. St. Ouen and Genevilliers near Paris. On November 2, 1944, the Associated Press wired a report on the Battle of Merseburg near Leipzig, Germany. Fladmark was flying with an armada of 1100 bombers and 900 fighters when they encountered over 400 Luftwaffe fighters on the way to a combat mission near Berlin, Germany. During the Battle of Merseburg, over half of the Luftwaffe fighters were destroyed by the 8th Air Force, setting a new record. Fladmark completed a total of 64 combat missions over Nazi Germany and received the Air Medal with ten oak leaf clusters. After his tour of duty, he was transferred to the United States on January 24, 1945. He was stationed in Santa Ana, California until war's end. Fladmark was discharged from the U.S. Army Air Corps in 1945 and returned to Sioux Falls, South Dakota. Fladmark continued his education at Augustana College and also flew with Professor Robert Branson's aerobatic team of Flandreau, South Dakota.

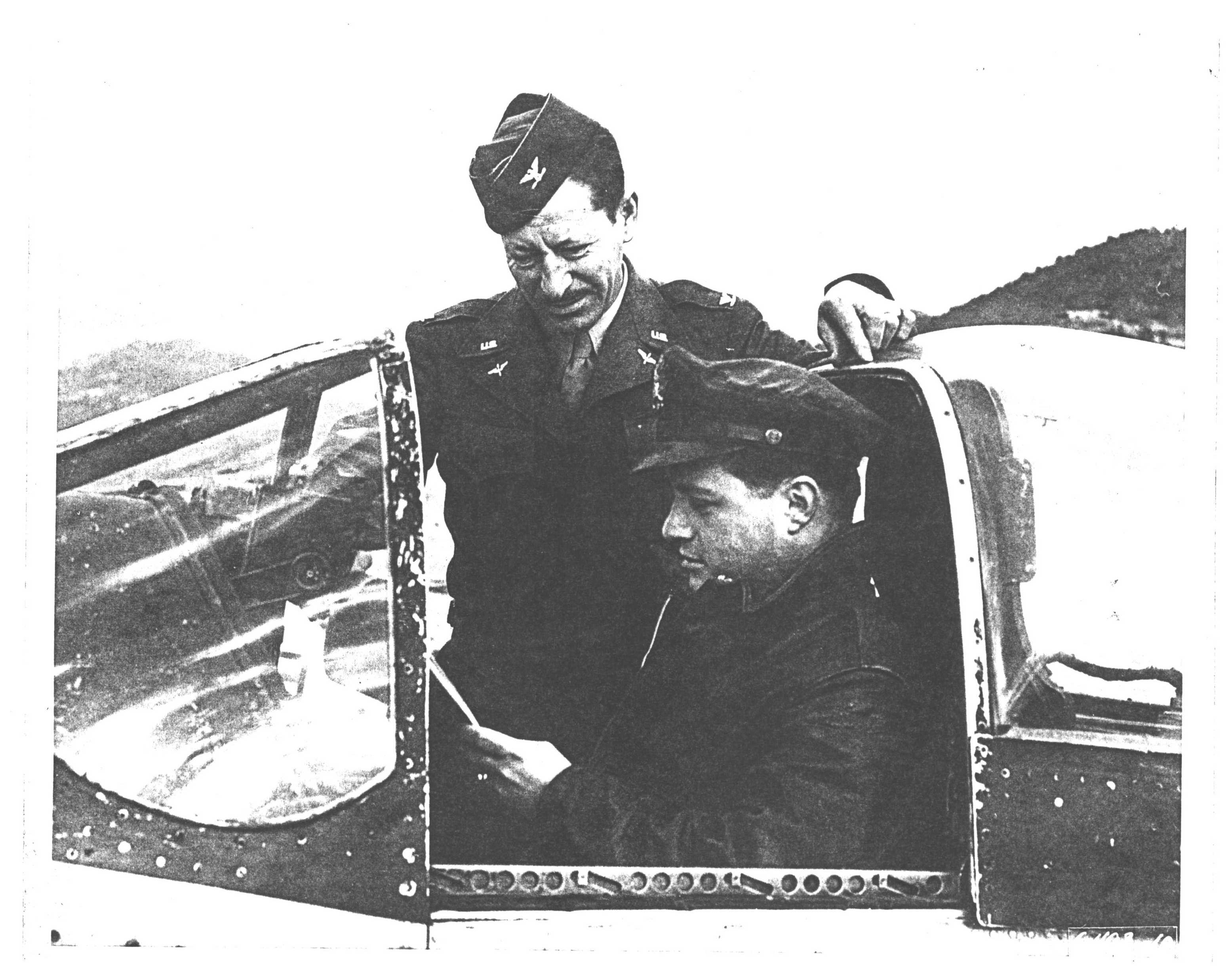
Colonel Frederick C. Gray, CO and Captain Oscar R. Fladmark, FC, 22 February 1951, Far East Forces, Korea

=== Post-World War II ===
The War Department authorized the establishment of Air National Guard units in all 48 states, with three units comprising a wing based in Sioux Falls, Sioux City and Des Moines, Iowa. The Air National Guard 132nd Wing was organized by Colonel Frederick C. Gray Jr. who was a veteran of the RAF and 8th Air Force during World War II. Colonel Gray, based in Des Moines, Iowa, acted as wing senior instructor for the three Air National Guard units which comprised the wing. Col. Gray's appointment was made by Brigadier General Charles H. Grahl, Iowa Adjutant General, on June 26, 1946. Col. Frederick C. Gray Jr. later attended the Air War College, Maxwell Air Force Base, Alabama.

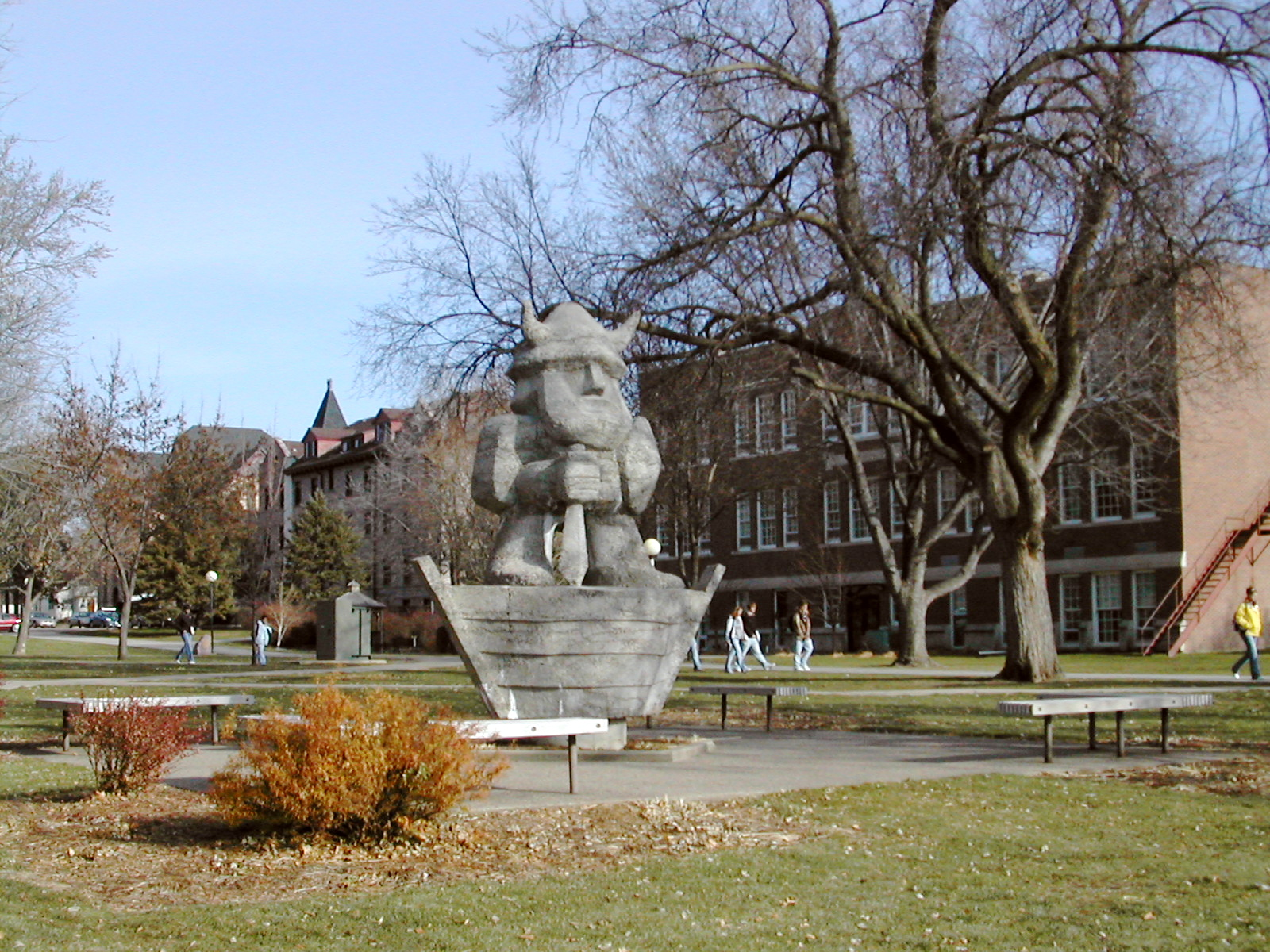
Augustana University's mascot, Ole, with the Administration Building, East Hall, and Old Main visible in the background

In 1946, Fladmark was appointed to the rank of Captain and the duty of a Flight Commander with the Air National Guard 175th Fighter Squadron based in Sioux Falls. Fladmark's appointment was approved by Colonel E.A. Beckwith, South Dakota Adjutant General in Rapid City, South Dakota on September 20, 1946. He completed his Bachelor of Arts degree at Augustana College in Sioux Falls in 1948. He also worked for the local newspaper the Argus Leader.

=== Korean War ===
Fladmark was recalled into the Air Force on November 14, 1950, for training in jet fighters and a tour in the Korean War. In February 1951, Fladmark reunited with a flying friend when he was assigned to the 35th Fighter-Interceptor Wing, which was reactivated by Colonel Frederick Gray. The 35th Fighter-Interceptor Wing was a component of the 5th Air Force, Far East Forces. During the Korean War, he flew 100 combat missions over North Korea. A report from Headquarters of the 13th Air Force at Clark Air Force Base in the Philippines, reads:

The Distinguished Flying Cross

"Captain Oscar Fladmark, son of Mr. & Mrs. Oscar Fladmark, Sioux Falls, South Dakota and husband of Mrs. Phyllis Fladmark, Sioux Falls, South Dakota, was recently awarded The Distinguished Flying Cross. Assigned as a pilot for the 44th Fighter Squadron (Bomber), Philippines Command (Air Force) and 13th Air Force, Clark Air Force Base, Philippines, Fladmark received the award for exceptionally meritorious service performed on April 24, leading a flight of four F-51 type aircraft on a close support mission, Fladmark displayed airmanship by leading his flight to the target area near Hwachon, Korea, in below marginal weather where the flight carried out a series of devastating attacks on the enemy. With Napalm rockets and machine guns, Fladmark led the flight in pass after pass on the enemy in hazardous mountainous terrain. Only after maximum results had been achieved did Fladmark reassemble his flight and proceed to his home base. Due to the nature of the target and the type of attack it was impossible to ascertain the exact destruction wrought on the enemy by Fladmark but the flight was credited with over 100 Communist troops killed. As a result of this highly successful mission the enemy's drive in the Hwachon area was greatly impeded."

=== Post-Korean War ===
Fladmark, upon his return from the Korean War, was appointed Assistant Professor of Air Science and Tactics for the Reserve Officers Training Corps program at St. Olaf College, Northfield, Minnesota. The Air Force training programs were previous to the establishment of the United States Air Force Academy in Colorado Springs, Colorado. The Air Force subsequently reassigned him to active duty status, and he was stationed with the 85th Fighter Interceptor Group, at Scott Air Force Base in Belleville, Illinois in September, 1951.

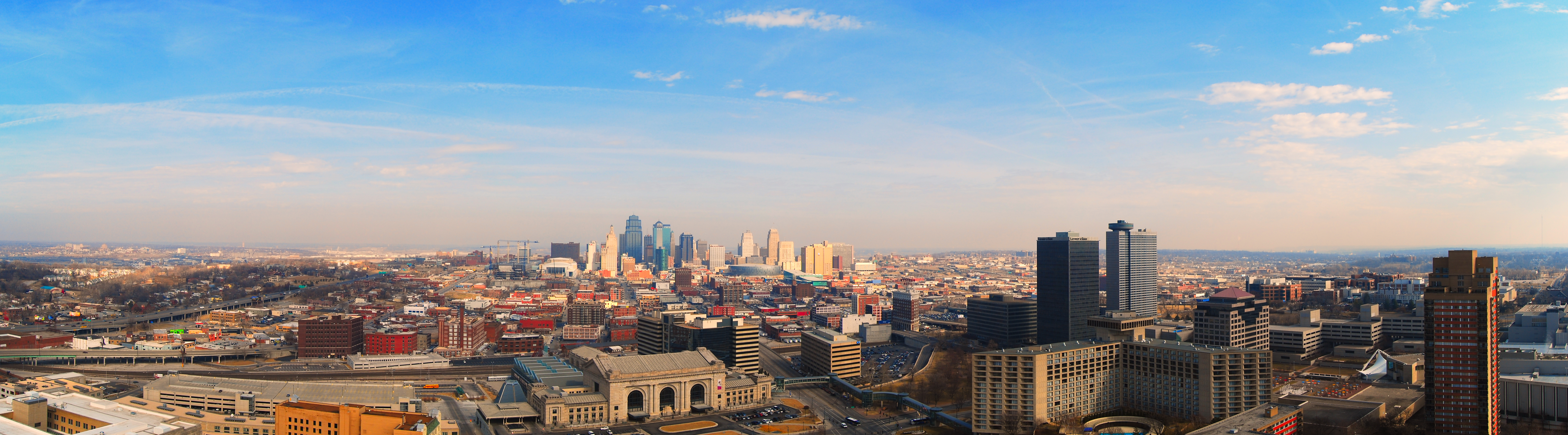
A panoramic view of Kansas City, Missouri from the top of Liberty Memorial looking north to downtown. Union Station is in the foreground and the Crown Center to the right.

Later, in April 1954, he was transferred to the 326th Fighter Intercepter Group at the Headquarters of Central Air Defense Force at Grandview Air Force Base, in Grandview, Missouri with Major General Jarred V. Crabb as Commanding Officer. The Central Air Defense Force was One of Three Air Defense Force; Eastern, Central & Western which were responsible for the Defense of Continental North America.

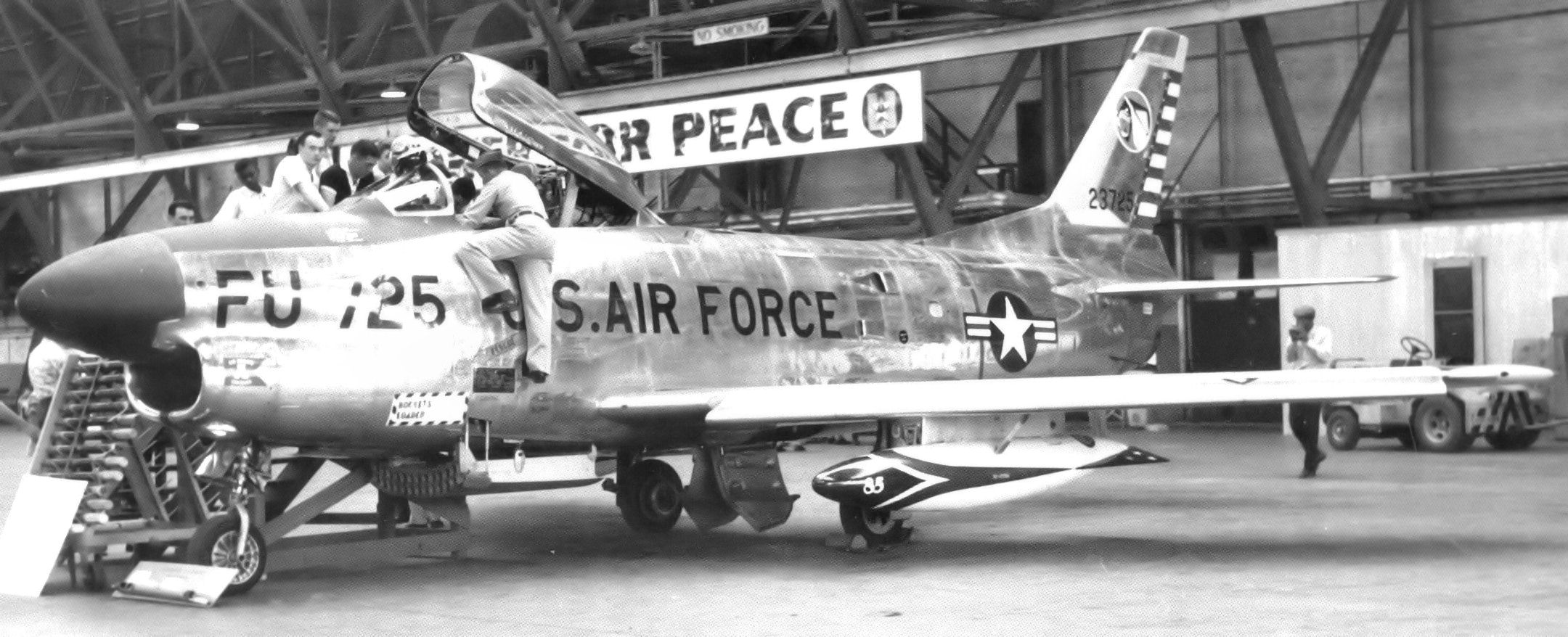
85th Fighter-Interceptor Squadron North American F-86D-40 NA Sabre 52-3725 20th Air Division, Scott Air Force Base, Illinois May 1957

In 1954, Fladmark was given an award for breaking the Sound barrier in a North American F-86 Sabre fighter jet. The award was the "Mach Busters Club" Citation for exceeding the Speed of Sound from North American Aviation Chairman of the Board James Howard Kindelberger and President John Leland Atwood.

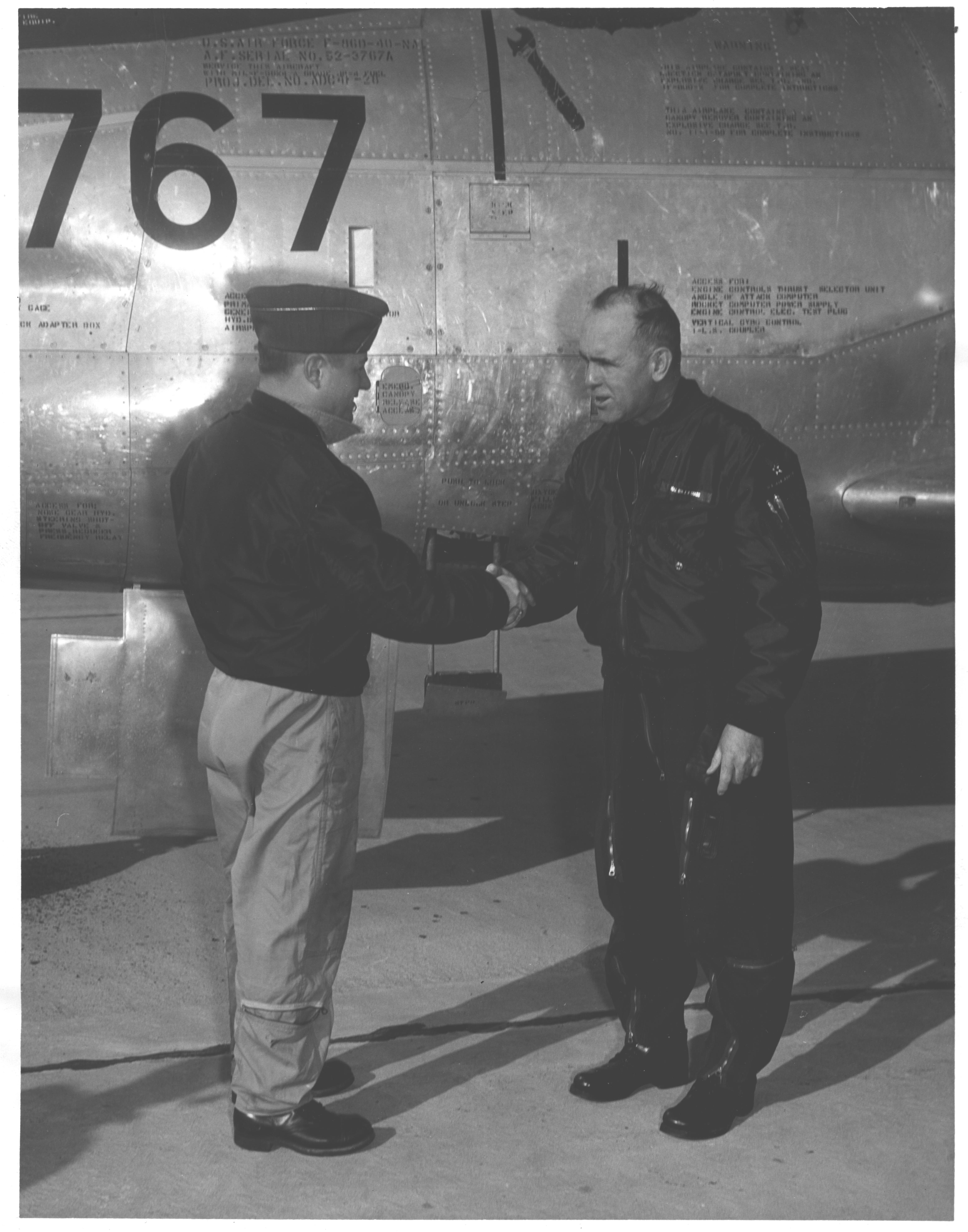
Major Oscar R. Fladmark, L and Major General Jarred V. Crabb, R at Grandview Air Force Base, Missouri, CADF, circa 1955

== Personal life ==
Fladmark married Phyllis Peterson (1922–2003) on November 13, 1950, at First Lutheran Church in Sioux Falls, South Dakota. They had a son and a daughter. She grew up on a farm in rural South Dakota. Her family was of Danish and Norwegian national heritage.

== Death ==
On July 27, 1955, Fladmark, two other Air Force officers and a General Electric gas turbine engineer who was driving a 1955 Ford Fairlane hardtop convertible were killed when the car overturned on an access road to Yuma County Airport near Yuma, Arizona. He was survived by his wife Phyllis, son Gary, daughter Vicki, father Oscar C. Fladmark Sr., mother Pethryn Fladmark and brother Captain Lorentz W. Fladmark. His widow sued General Electric, but lost the case in 1956. The lawsuit which went to trial was initially investigated by JAG under the direction of Major General Jarred V. Crabb, Commanding Officer. Subsequent to the investigation a Wrongful Death action was filed through a law firm with offices in the Federal Reserve Building, Kansas City, Missouri.

== Decorations ==
Fladmark's Military Decorations and Awards:

Senior Pilot USAF Wings
Distinguished Flying Cross	Air Medal with ten oak leaf clusters	Presidential Unit Citation
United Nations Korea Medal	United Nations (UN) Korean Service Medal	American Defense Service Medal
American Campaign Medal with three Service stars	European-African-Middle Eastern Campaign Medal – World War II	World War II Victory Medal

Other Honors and Recognitions:

- Charter Member of the South Dakota Air National Guard in 1946,
- "Mach Busters Club" Citation for exceeding the Speed of Sound in 1954 by North American Aviation Chairman of the Board James Howard Kindelberger and President John Leland Atwood

== Memorials ==
A memorial bronze plaque was dedicated to Fladmark at the Gilbert Science Center on the campus of Augustana College, Sioux Falls, South Dakota, by his father in 1965. Oscar C. Fladmark Sr. often dedicated his KSOO radio broadcasts to his son. Fladmark's biography is listed on the "Wall of Honor" at the Smithsonian National Air and Space Museum Steven F. Udvar-Hazy Center facility near the Washington Dulles International Airport, Fairfax, Virginia.
