= Ray Wetmore =

Ray Shuey Wetmore
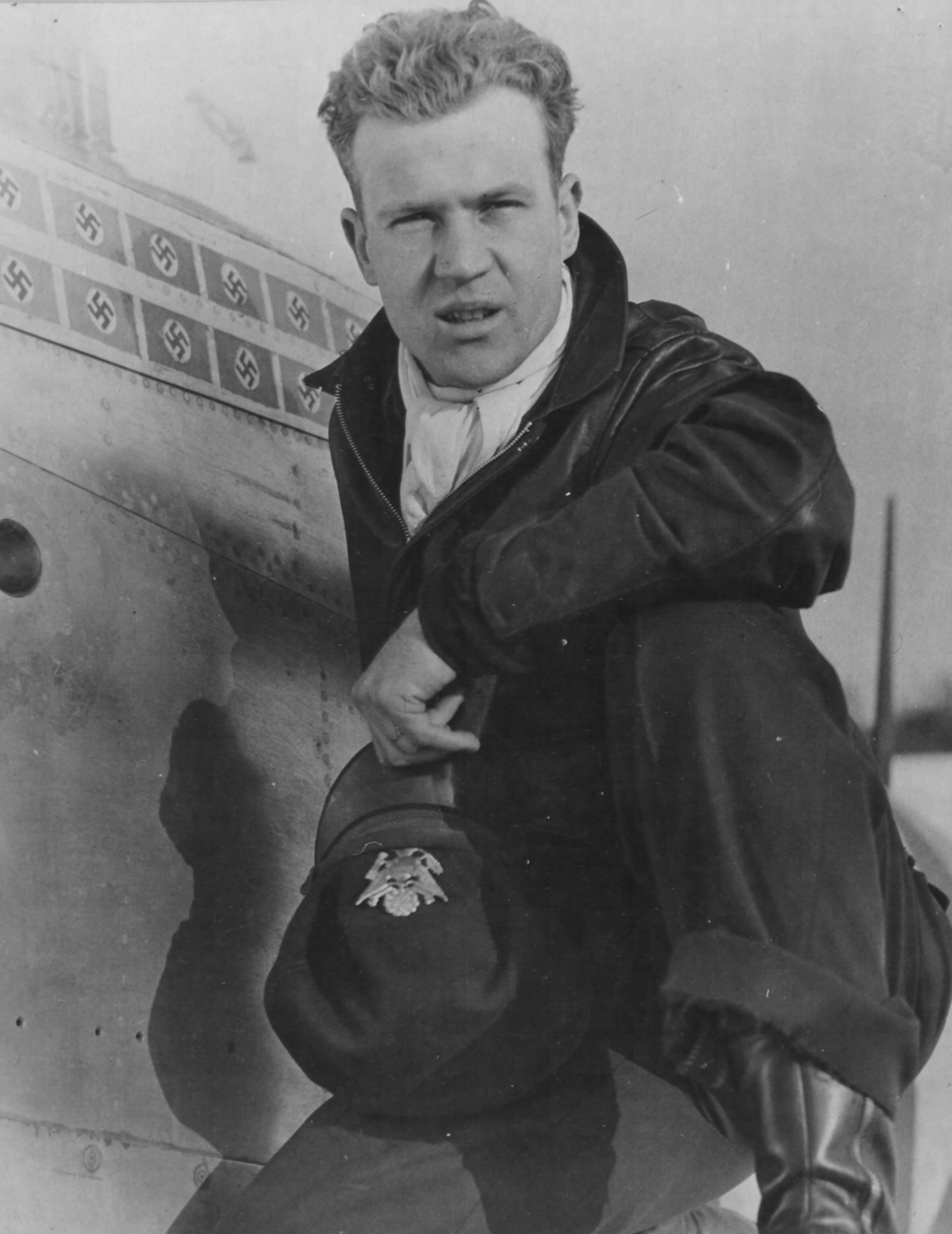
- Ray S. Westmore in 1945
- Born: September 30, 1923; Kerman, California, U.S.
- Died: February 14, 1951 (aged 27); Sandwich, Massachusetts, U.S.
- Burial place: Santa Cruz Cemetery; Santa Cruz, California
- Military career
- Allegiance: United States
- Branch: United States Army Air Forces; United States Air Force
- Service years: 1941–1951
- Rank: Lieutenant colonel
- Nickname: "X-Ray Eyes"
- Unit: 359th Fighter Group
- Commands: 59th Fighter-Interceptor Squadron
- Conflicts: World War II
- Awards: Distinguished Service Cross (2); Silver Star (2); Distinguished Flying Cross (6); Air Medal (13)

Ray Shuey Wetmore (September 30, 1923 – February 14, 1951) was a quadruple ace of United States Army Air Forces over Europe during World War II. He was credited with 21.25 victories in aerial combat. He was killed in an accidental crash of an F-86 at or near Otis Air Force Base.

== Early life ==
Born in Kerman, California, Wetmore enlisted in the U.S. Army Air Corps as an armament specialist on November 24, 1941, entered the Aviation Cadet Program on July 3, 1942, and was commissioned a 2d Lt and awarded his pilot wings on March 20, 1943.

== Military career ==
=== World War II ===
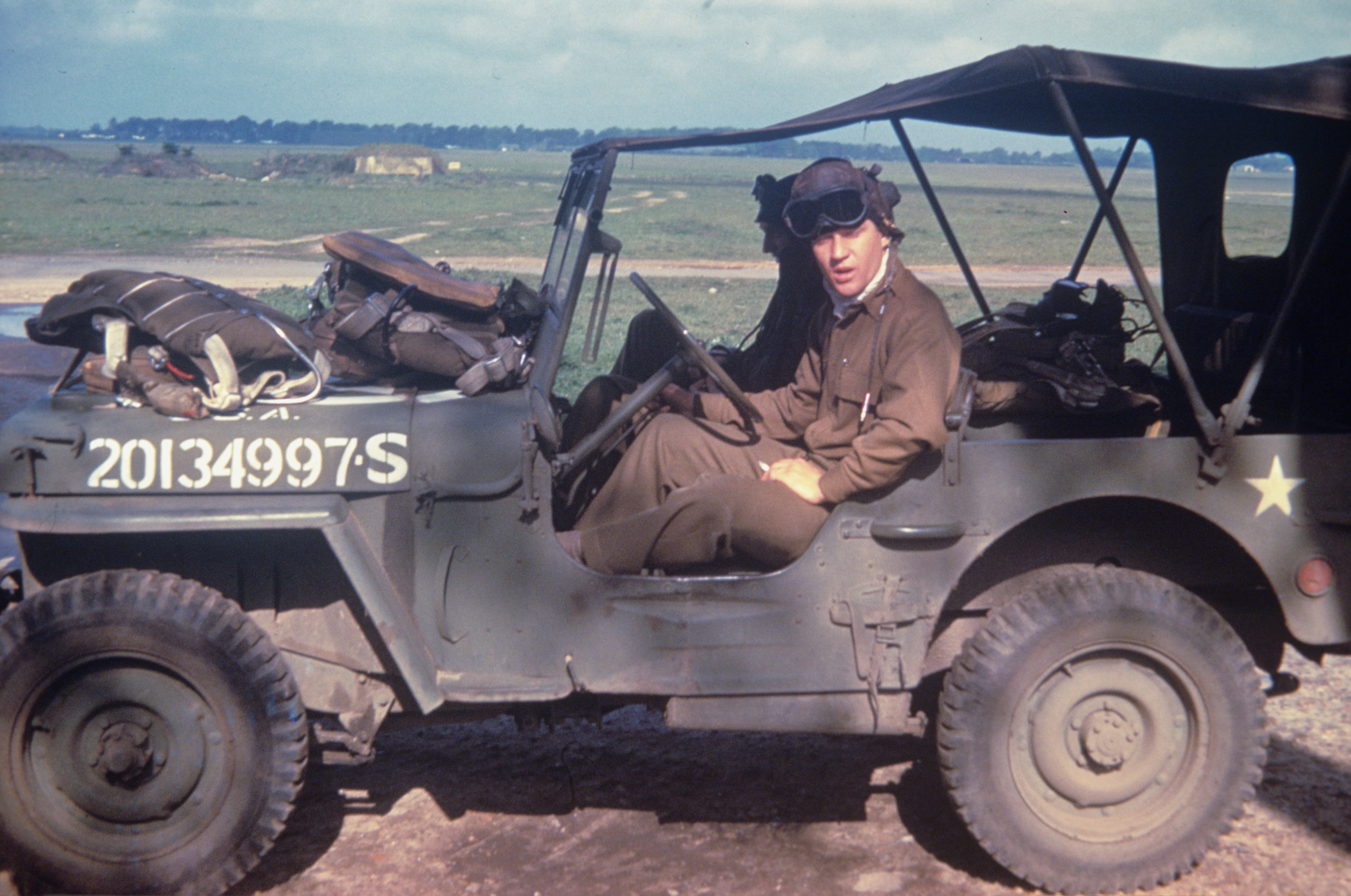
Wetmore driving a jeep at RAF East Wretham

Upon commissioning in March 1943 he joined the new 359th Fighter Group which was sent to England in October that year. Flying with the 370th Fighter Squadron, in February and March 1944 Wetmore scored his first 4.25 victories flying the Republic P-47 Thunderbolt.

After retraining to fly a North American P-51 Mustang, Wetmore achieved the title of ace, shooting down two Bf 109s on May 19, 1944. He flew an aircraft bearing the legend "Daddy's Girl". There were several planes with this title in the 359th Fighter Group at that time. All of Wetmore's fighters – a P-47D, a P-51B and a P-51D – bore this name. By the end of May 1944, the number of Wetmore's victories had reached 8.25. In a little over a year of military activities, Wetmore had shot down 15 enemy aircraft and been promoted to the rank of captain.

The two tours of duty that Wetmore served made him a witness to the downfall of the Luftwaffe. On November 27, 1944, Wetmore and Lieutenant Р. York engaged in a skirmish with almost a hundred Bf.109 fighters to the north of Munster. As Wetmore himself said later: "To defend ourselves, we had to attack." Three Messerschmitts were shot down in the battle. The Americans escaped the battle without losses.

Wetmore's next success was on January 14, 1945, when he shot down four Fw 190s in one day not far from the Dümmer lake airfield. His wingman took down a fifth enemy plane. In total on that day, the entire 359th Fighter Group recorded 4.5 victories. Wetmore achieved his last victory on March 15, 1945, near Wittenberg, destroying an Ме-163 rocket fighter. While he was chasing the Me 163, the air speed indicator on Wetmore's P-51D showed 600 miles per hour. In total, Wetmore completed around 142 combat flights throughout World War II. His final score was 21.25 destroyed, one damaged in aerial combat and 2.33 ground victories. It is the highest score in the 359th Fighter Group and eighth best of all American flying aces in the European Theater. On VE Day, he was a 21-year-old major.

=== Post war ===
After the war, Wetmore served with the 1st Fighter Group at March Field from December 1945 to November 1946. After attending Officer's Electronics School, he was assigned as Operations Officer with the 37th Fighter Squadron of 14th Fighter Group at Dow Air Force Base, from October 1947 to March 1949.

Wetmore was next assigned to 1st Air Force, where he served from March 1949 to December 1950. His final assignment was as Commander of the 59th Fighter-Interceptor Squadron of 33rd Fighter-Interceptor Group at Otis Air Force Base.

== Death ==
As a major, Wetmore commanded the 59th Fighter-Interceptor Squadron at Otis Air Force Base, Massachusetts.

On February 14, 1951, Wetmore took off from Los Angeles in an F-86 Sabre on a trip to Otis. When he was on his final approach, his plane suddenly shot up skyward, and then turned towards the ground where it crashed. Wetmore was killed instantly. He was reported to have said that he could not slow the plane or eject. He was also reported to have said to the tower that, "I'm going to go up and bring it down in Wakeby Lake, so I don't hit any houses." When he died, he left a widow and four children.

== Aerial victory credits ==
Date	#	Type	Location	Aircraft flown	Unit Assigned
February 10, 1944	1	Messerschmitt Bf 109	Den Ham, Netherlands	P-47D	370 FS, 359 FG
March 4, 1944	0.25	Bf 109	Bonn, Germany	P-47D	370 FS, 359 FG
March 16, 1944	2	Focke-Wulf Fw 190	Sommesous, France	P-47D	370 FS, 359 FG
April 22, 1944	1	Fw 190	Hamm, Germany	P-47D	370 FS, 359 FG
May 19, 1944	2	Bf 109	Stendal, Germany	P-51B	370 FS, 359 FG
May 29, 1944	2	Fw 190	Stettin, Germany	P-51B	370 FS, 359 FG
November 2, 1944	2	Bf 109	Erfurt, Germany	P-51D	370 FS, 359 FG
November 27, 1944	3	Bf 109	Hanover, Germany	P-51D	370 FS, 359 FG
December 31, 1944	1.5	Bf 109	Hanover, Germany	P-51D	370 FS, 359 FG
January 1, 1945	1	Bf 109	Lüneburg, Germany	P-51D	370 FS, 359 FG
January 14, 1945	4.5	Fw 190	Dümmer Lake, Germany	P-51D	370 FS, 359 FG
March 15, 1945	1	Messerschmitt Me 163	Wittenberg, Germany	P-51D	370 FS, 359 FG

SOURCES: Air Force Historical Study 85: USAF Credits for the Destruction of Enemy Aircraft, World War II

== Awards and decorations ==
His military decorations include:

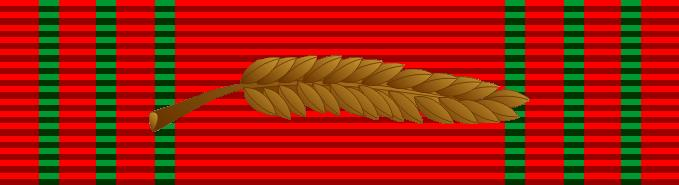
USAF Senior Pilot Badge
Distinguished Service Cross with bronze oak leaf cluster
Silver Star with bronze oak leaf cluster
Distinguished Flying Cross with silver oak leaf cluster
Air Medal with two silver and two bronze oak leaf clusters
Air Force Presidential Unit Citation
Army Good Conduct Medal
American Defense Service Medal
American Campaign Medal
European-African-Middle Eastern Campaign Medal with silver and bronze campaign stars
World War II Victory Medal
National Defense Service Medal
Air Force Longevity Service Award with bronze oak leaf cluster
Croix de Guerre with silver star (France)
Croix de Guerre with Palm (Belgium)

=== Distinguished Service Cross citation (1st award) ===

Wetmore, Ray
Captain (Air Corps), U.S. Army Air Forces
370th Fighter Squadron, 359th Fighter Group, 8th Air Force
Date of Action: November 2, 1944

Citation:

The President of the United States of America, authorized by Act of Congress, July 9, 1918, takes pleasure in presenting the Distinguished Service Cross to Captain (Air Corps) Ray Shuey Wetmore, United States Army Air Forces, for extraordinary heroism in connection with military operations against an armed enemy while serving as Pilot of a P-51 Fighter Airplane in the 370th Fighter Squadron, 359th Fighter Group, Eighth Air Force, in aerial combat against enemy forces on 2 November 1944, during a bomber escort mission over Germany. Upon leaving the target, Captain Wetmore spotted thirty Me-109's which he immediately led his section of six airplanes to engage. He overtook the enemy and by the vigor and daring of his attack broke up the Me-109 formation. Scoring hits on one enemy airplane, he pursued it alone through the undercast to complete its destruction. Alone under the overcast, he then engaged from fifteen to twenty more Me-109's, refusing to break off the action in the face of repeated passes by the enemy pilots although only two of his guns were firing. Despite the overwhelming numerical superiority of the enemy, his cool courage and superb skill as a combat pilot resulted in the destruction of another enemy fighter, and the remaining Me-109's then dispersed. Captain Wetmore's resolute determination to attack and destroy the enemy in the face of every hazard and his eagerness to force combat against heavy odds have been an inspiration to his fellow flyers and reflect highest credit upon himself, the 8th Air Force, and the United States Army Air Forces.

=== Distinguished Service Cross citation (2nd award) ===

Wetmore, Ray
Captain (Air Corps), U.S. Army Air Forces
370th Fighter Squadron, 359th Fighter Group, 8th Air Force
Date of Action: November 27, 1944

Citation:

The President of the United States of America, authorized by Act of Congress, July 9, 1918, takes pleasure in presenting a Bronze Oak Leaf Cluster in lieu of a Second Award of the Distinguished Service Cross to Captain (Air Corps) Ray Shuey Wetmore, United States Army Air Forces, for extraordinary heroism in connection with military operations against an armed enemy while serving as Pilot of a P-51 Fighter Airplane in the 370th Fighter Squadron, 359th Fighter Group, Eighth Air Force, in aerial combat against enemy forces on 27 November 1944, during an air mission over Germany. On this date, Captain Wetmore was leader of a flight of four P-51 fighter aircraft on a fighter sweep mission over north central Germany. During the mission he sighted three formations of enemy aircraft, totaling more than 200 FW 190's and Me-109's. With total disregard for his own personal safety, Major Wetmore tracked the hostile fighters, radioing their positions, altitude and course to his nearby fighter group. Supporting fighters failed to arrive, and Major Wetmore, ignoring the fact of the overwhelming odds of 200 to 2, chose to attack three of the enemy aircraft in the air. The action of Major Wetmore on this occasion was a clear demonstration of the willful selection of the more hazardous of two acceptable and honorable courses of action, since his withdrawal from the combat under such overwhelmingly unfavorable circumstances would certainly have been acceptable. Captain Wetmore's unquestionable valor in aerial combat is in keeping with the highest traditions of the military service and reflects great credit upon himself, the 8th Air Force, and the United States Army Air Forces.

== Notes ==
- Dr. Frank Olynyk (1995). Stars & Bars: A Tribute to the American Fighter Ace 1920–1973. Grub Street, London.
- Lt. John F. McAlevey (March, 1971. Encounter at Remagen: U.S. Air Ace's Brush with Death, Veterans of Foreign Wars Magazine, pp. 26–27,32)
