= 370th Division =

370th Division may refer to:

- 370th Infantry Division, Wehrmacht, Germany
- 370th Rifle Division, Soviet Union

== See also ==
- List of military divisions by number
- 370th (disambiguation)
