= 370th =

370th may refer to:

- 370th Air Expeditionary Wing, provisional United States Air Force unit assigned to United States Air Forces Central
- 370th Fighter Group or 140th Operations Group, unit of the Colorado Air National Guard, stationed at Buckley Air Force Base, Aurora, Colorado
- 370th Fighter Squadron, inactive United States Army Air Forces unit
- 370th Flight Test Squadron, United States Air Force unit assigned to the 413th Flight Test Group, stationed at Edwards AFB, California
- 370th Infantry Regiment (United States), the designation for one of the infantry regiments of the 93rd (Provisional) Infantry Division in World War I, sometimes also referred to as the 8th Illinois

== See also ==
- 370 (number)
- 370, the year 370 (CCCLXX) of the Julian calendar
- 370 BC
