= Cranshaw =

Surname list

Cranshaw is a surname. Notable people with the surname include:

- Bob Cranshaw (1932–2016), American jazz bassist
- Patrick Cranshaw (1919–2005), American character actor

== See also ==
- Cranshaws, village in Scotland
- Crashaw
- Crenshaw (surname)
