= Claude J. Crenshaw =

American World War II flying ace

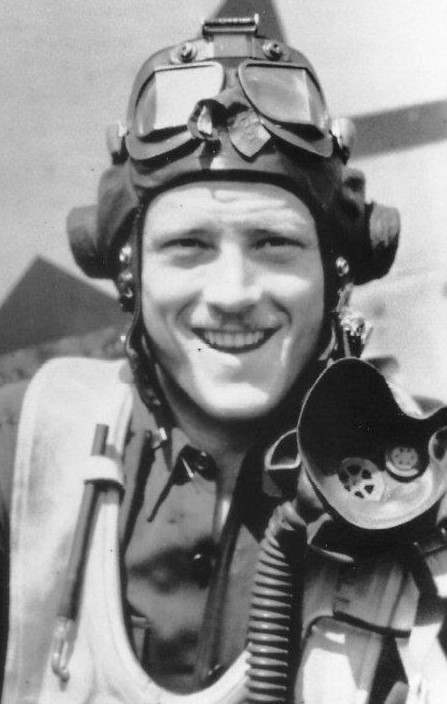
- Crenshaw in 1944
- Born: Claude James Crenshaw; December 12, 1918; Monroe, Louisiana, U.S.
- Died: March 17, 1972 (aged 53); San Bernardino, California, U.S.
- Burial place: Victor Valley Memorial Park Cemetery, Victorville, California
- Military career
- Allegiance: United States
- Branch: Army Air Forces; Air Force
- Service years: 1942–1965
- Rank: Lieutenant colonel
- Units: 368th Fighter Squadron; 359th Fighter Group
- Commands: 435th Tactical Fighter Squadron; 436th Tactical Fighter Squadron; 434th Tactical Fighter Squadron; 4443rd Combat Crew Training Squadron
- Conflicts: World War II
- Awards: Distinguished Service Cross; Distinguished Flying Cross (2); Air Medal (10)

Claude James Crenshaw (December 12, 1918 – March 17, 1972) was a United States Air Force lieutenant colonel and a flying ace, who was credited in destroying seven enemy aircraft in aerial combat during World War II.

== Early life ==
Crenshaw was born in 1918, in Monroe, Louisiana.

== World War II ==
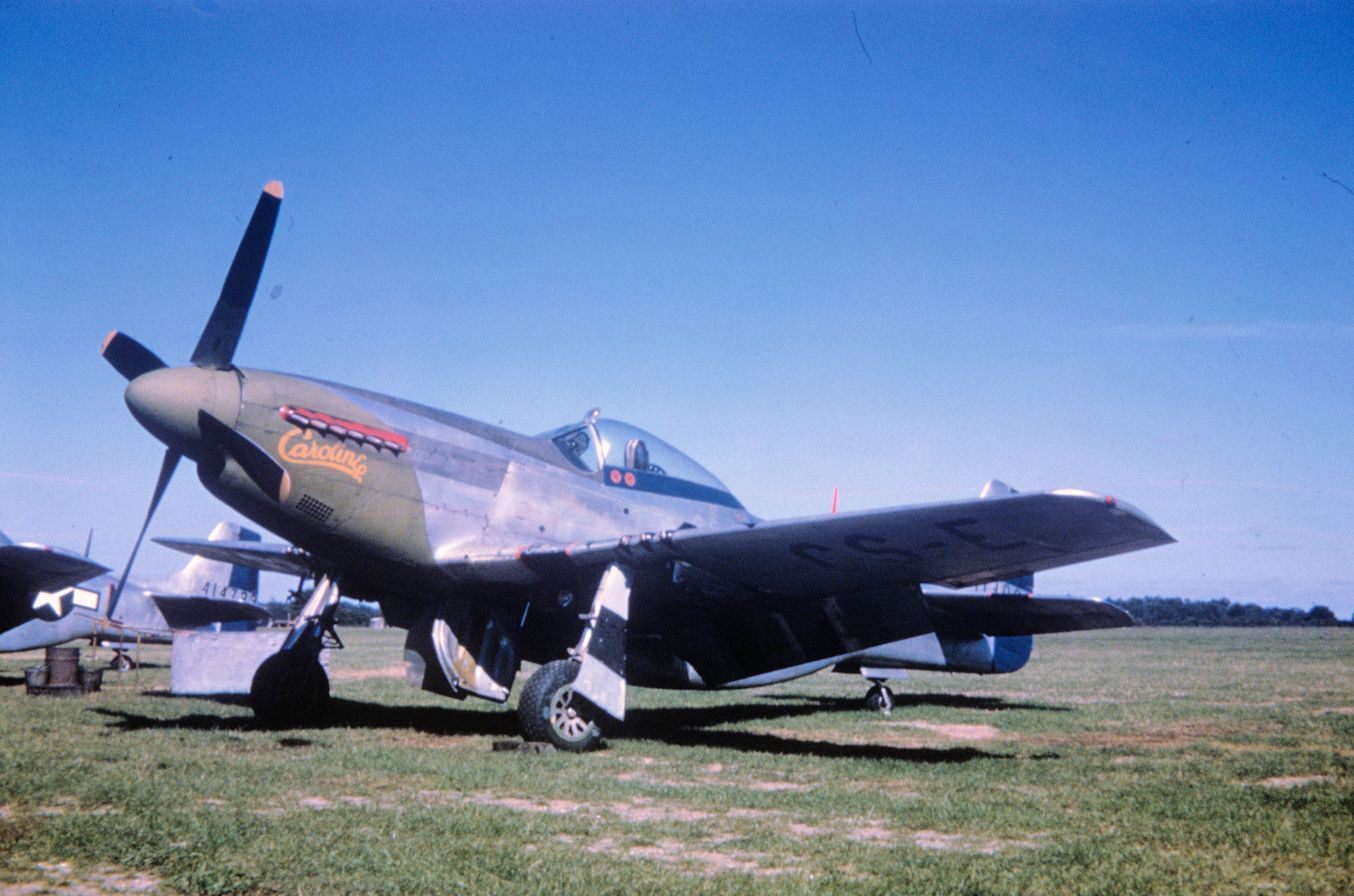
P-51 of the 359th Fighter Group

In April 1944, Crenshaw was assigned to the 369th Fighter Squadron within the 359th Fighter Group in the European Theater of Operations. Based at RAF East Wretham, he flew missions in the North American P-51 Mustang.

On September 11, 1944, while leading a flight over Kölleda, Germany, Crenshaw's flight encountered 100 Messerschmitt Bf 109s. In the encounter, Crenshaw shot down two Bf 109s and on the same mission, he and his wingman strafed an enemy airfield with Crenshaw destroying an enemy airplane on the ground. On September 18, during a mission over Düsseldorf, Germany, he shot down a Bf 109 that was attacking his wingman, bringing his total to three aerial victories.

On November 21, during a bomber escort over Merseburg, Germany, his flight encountered a massive formation of Focke-Wulf Fw 190 attempting to attack the bombers. During the dogfight, Crenshaw and his wingman were separated from the flight after flying into a haze. In the dogfight, he and his wingman alone attacked the gaggle of Fw 190s with Crenshaw shooting down four Fw 190s and another probable. After his return to the base, it was discovered that only three of the six guns in his P-51 were working during the mission. For his heroism in the mission, Crenshaw was awarded the Distinguished Service Cross.

During World War II, Crenshaw was credited in shooting down seven enemy aircraft in aerial combat, one probable and three destroyed on the ground while strafing enemy airfields. While serving with the 359th FG, he flew P-51 bearing the name "Louisiana Heatwave".

== Post war ==
In December 1944, Crenshaw returned to the United States. Following the end of World War II, he continued to serve in the newly created United States Air Force and retired in 1965 at the rank of lieutenant colonel.

== Later life ==
Crenshaw married Johnnie Ruth, née Hudson in 1943. The couple had three daughters and one son, and numerous grand and great-grandchildren.

Crenshaw died on March 17, 1972, at the age of 53 due to lung cancer. He was buried at Victor Valley Memorial Park Cemetery in Victorville, California.

== Aerial victory credits ==
Date	#	Type	Location	Aircraft flown	Unit Assigned
September 11, 1944	2	Messerschmitt Bf 109	Kölleda, Germany	P-51D Mustang	368 FS, 359 FG
September 18, 1944	1	Bf 109	Düsseldorf, Germany	P-51D	368 FS, 359 FG
November 21, 1944	4	Focke-Wulf Fw 190	Merseburg, Germany	P-51D	368 FS, 359 FG

SOURCES: Air Force Historical Study 85: USAF Credits for the Destruction of Enemy Aircraft, World War II

== Awards and decorations ==
Crenshaw's awards include:

USAF Command pilot badge
Distinguished Service Cross
Distinguished Flying Cross with bronze oak leaf cluster
Air Medal with one silver and three bronze oak leaf clusters
Air Medal (second ribbon required for accoutrement spacing)
Air Force Presidential Unit Citation
American Campaign Medal
European-African-Middle Eastern Campaign Medal with three bronze campaign stars
World War II Victory Medal
Army of Occupation Medal with 'Germany' clasp
National Defense Service Medal with bronze service star
Armed Forces Expeditionary Medal
Air Force Longevity Service Award with four bronze oak leaf clusters
Armed Forces Reserve Medal with bronze hourglass device

=== Distinguished Service Cross citation ===

Crenshaw, Claude J.
Captain (Air Corps), U.S. Army Air Forces
369th Fighter Squadron, 359th Fighter Group, 8th Air Force
Date of Action: November 21, 1944

Citation:

The President of the United States of America, authorized by Act of Congress, July 9, 1918, takes pleasure in presenting the Distinguished Service Cross to Captain (Air Corps) Claude James Crenshaw, United States Army Air Forces, for extraordinary heroism in connection with military operations against an armed enemy while serving as Pilot of a P-51 Fighter Airplane in the 369th Fighter Squadron, 359th Fighter Group, Eighth Air Force, while serving as Flight Leader of a bomber escort mission in the vicinity of Merseburg, Germany, on 21 November 1944. On this date, accompanied by only his wingman, Captain Crenshaw attacked a formation of one hundred enemy fighters having a top cover of thirty-five additional fighter aircraft. In his great desire to protect the bomber formation, he pursued the enemy relentlessly, destroying four of their aircraft and damaging still another despite the enemy's vast numerical superiority. The outstanding heroism and determination to destroy the enemy displayed by Captain Crenshaw on this occasion are in keeping with the highest traditions of the Armed Forces of the United States.
