= Avelin P. Tacon Jr. =

United States Air Force general

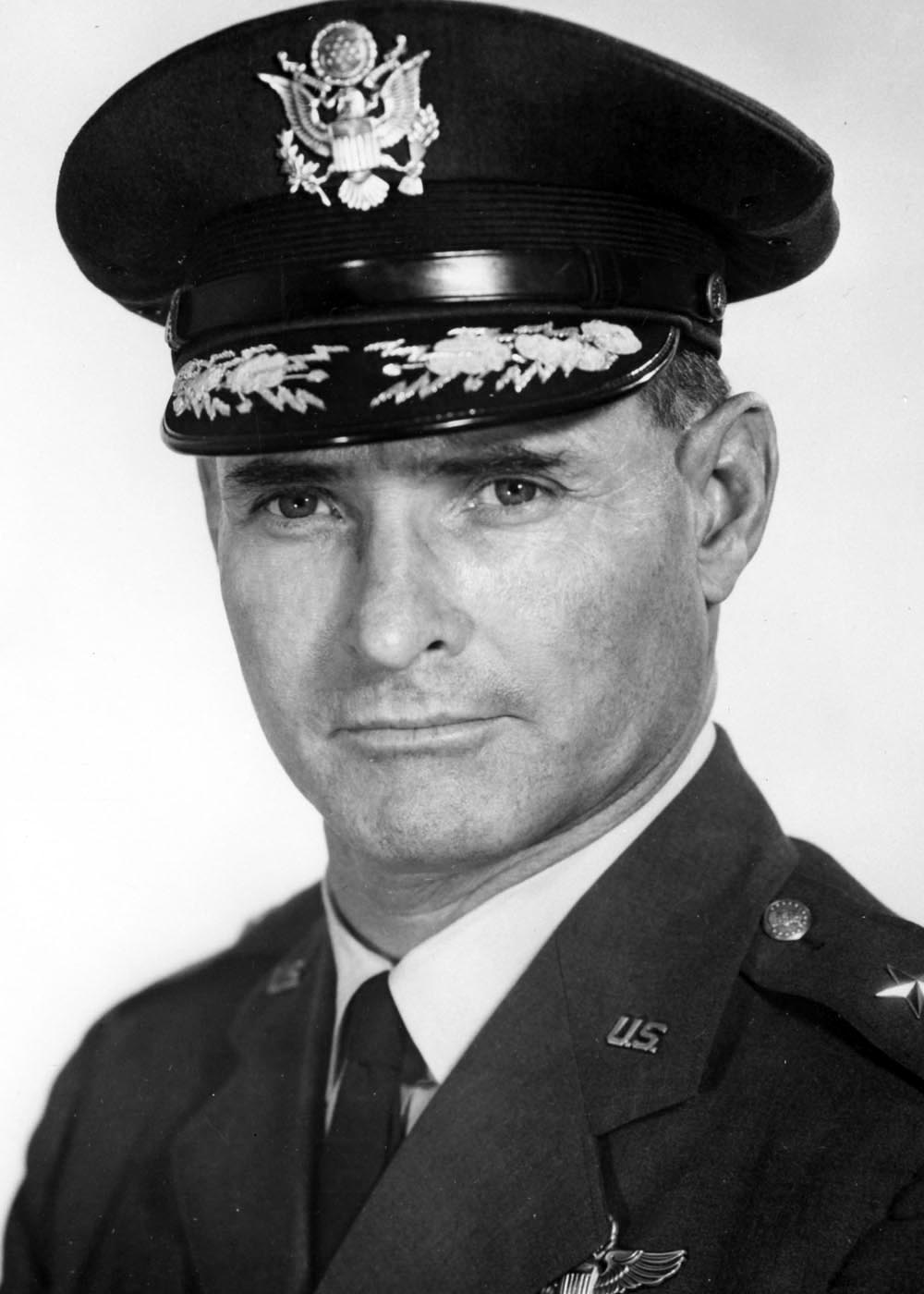
- Born: December 4, 1914; Mobile, Alabama
- Died: July 4, 2014 (aged 99); Mobile, Alabama
- Military career
- Allegiance: United States of America
- Branch: United States Air Force
- Service years: 1937–1967
- Rank: Major General
- Commands: 359th Fighter Group; Deputy commander, 12th Air Force, others below
- Awards: Legion of Merit, Distinguished Flying Cross with two clusters, Air Medal with six Clusters, Commendation Medal, and the Croix de Guerre with Palm

Avelin Paul Tacon Jr. (December 4, 1914 – July 4, 2014) was an American Air Force major general.

== Early life and education ==
He received his education from Murphy High School and Spring Hill College in his birthplace of Mobile, Alabama, prior to entering Primary Flying School at Randolph Field, Texas, in October 1936.

After graduation from primary and advanced flying schools at Randolph and Kelly fields, he was rated a pilot in October 1937.

As a second lieutenant, he was assigned to the 3rd Attack Group for a short period and later to the 55th Pursuit Squadron, 20th Pursuit Group, Barksdale Field, La. He served with the 55th for five years, eventually becoming the squadron commander. During that time, the squadron served at Moffett and Hamilton fields, Calif., and was eventually permanently assigned to Drew Field, Tampa, Fla.

== World War II ==
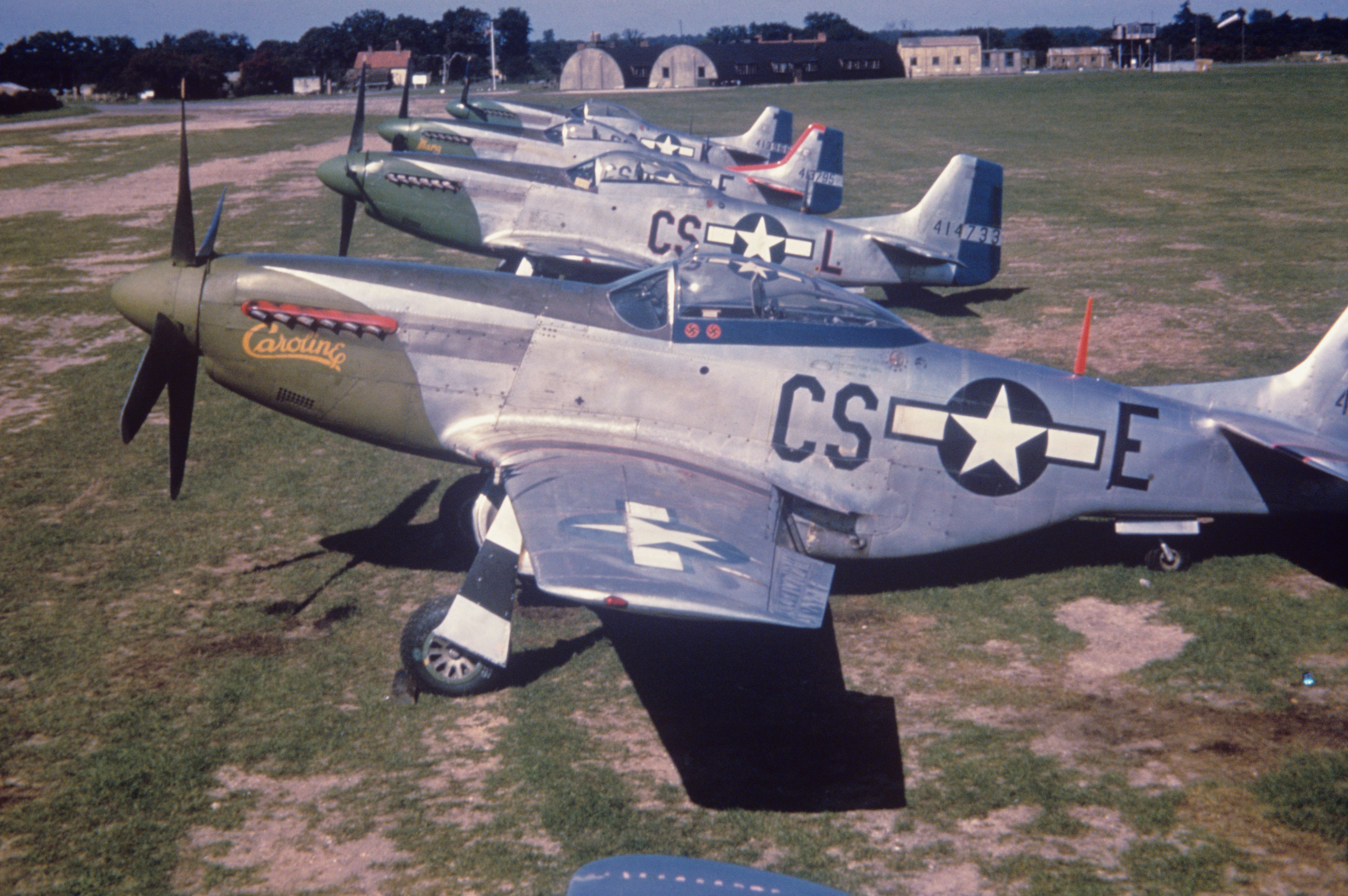
P-51 Mustangs of the 359th Fighter Group lined up at RAF East Wretham

In January 1943, then Lieutenant Colonel Tacon was transferred to Westover Field, Mass., to assume command of the newly organized 359th Fighter Group. The group was ordered to Europe in November 1943 and became operational at one of the many bases in England. As commander of his group, he led his men on fighter sweeps against occupied France and Germany and bomber escort missions.

After completion of his combat tour, he became executive officer of the 67th Fighter Wing with headquarters near Peterborough, England.

After the cessation of hostilities in Europe, Tacon was assigned to Headquarters American Graves Registration Command in Paris, for the purpose of organizing a staff section to aid in the location of missing aircrews. He remained in this assignment until April 1946 when he returned to the United States.

== Post-World War II ==
Upon return from Europe, he was assigned to duty within the Operations Division, Office of the Deputy Chief of Staff, Operations, at Headquarters U.S. Air Force in Washington. After completion of this tour, he went to the Air War College, Maxwell Air Force Base, Ala. After his 1949 graduation, he was assigned as assistant deputy for operations, Headquarters Air Training Command.

Tacon assumed command of Nellis Air Force Base, Nevada, in January 1951. At that time, the base was engaged in training replacement jet fighter pilots for fighter units stationed in Korea. In August 1952, he was reassigned to attend the National War College at Fort Lesley J. McNair, Washington, D.C.

Graduating in June 1953, he was ordered to Korea to assume command of the 18th Fighter Bomber Wing, stationed at Osan. The armistice with the North Koreans was declared the night Tacon landed in Japan; therefore, he missed possible combat in the Korean War by only a few hours. During his tour with the 18th he formed and personally led a precision acrobatic team of F-86s that was used in the rendition of honors to dignitaries visiting Fifth Air Force Headquarters at Osan.

He was reassigned to Headquarters Tactical Air Command, Langley Air Force Base, Virginia, in August 1954. He served as director of operations and training until 1957 when he took command of Foster Air Force Base, Texas, as wing commander of the 450th Fighter Wing. During his tour at Foster, the now Brigadier Tacon led the first deployment of a century series F-100 jet fighter squadron to Japan on Operation Mobile Zebra. The flight, accomplished by using air-to-air inflight refueling – with KB-50 tankers – was successfully completed and all of the squadron returned to Foster approximately one month after departure. Tacon served as commander at Foster until the base was deactivated during the summer of 1958.

While en route by car to assume command of the 831st Air Division at George Air Force Base, California, the Formosan crisis erupted. After being located by state police, he rushed to assume command of the Twelfth Air Force Task Force Command Element (Reserve) in Formosa.

He returned to George to take command of the division there and continue a policy of leadership by example. In August 1959, Tacon led six F-104 tactical fighters on Starblazer I from Myrtle Beach, S.C., to Moron Air Base, Spain. This was the first Atlantic crossing of the F-104 and paved the way for subsequent deployments of Starfighter squadrons.

In June 1960, he was transferred to Twelfth Air Force Headquarters in Waco to become deputy commander. He was promoted to major general in 1961.

Once again, in October 1961, Tacon found himself in the "thick" of another crisis, this time Berlin. Many fighter wings were activated and ordered to France to stave the crisis. The Twelfth Air Force deputy commander was ordered to inspect the progress of the deploying units and made important stops at Newfoundland, Iceland, England and France, the path of the National Guard fighters.

Tacon served as deputy commander, 12th Air Force until May 1962 when he was transferred to the Philippines to assume the duties of chief, Joint United States Military Advisory Group to the Republic of the Philippines. In this capacity, he is responsible for administering the U.S. Military Assistance Program to the Philippines, furnishing technical advice to the Armed Forces of the Philippines, and serving as a member of the staff of the American ambassador to the Philippines.

== Awards and decorations ==
Tacon is a command pilot with 300 combat hours. The general holds the Legion of Merit, Distinguished Flying Cross with two clusters, Air Medal with six Clusters, Commendation Medal, and the Croix de Guerre with Palm. He retired July 31, 1967, and died on July 4, 2014.
