= Crashaw =

Crashaw is a surname. Notable people with the surname include:

- Richard Crashaw (c. 1613–1649), English poet, teacher, Anglican cleric, and Catholic convert
- William Crashaw (1572–1626), English cleric, academic, and poet

== See also ==
- Cranshaw
