= Crenshaw House =

Crenshaw House may refer to:

- Crenshaw-Burleigh House, Dermott, Arkansas, listed on the National Register of Historic Places (NRHP) in Chicot County
- Crenshaw House (Gallatin County, Illinois), also known as the Old Slave House, listed on the NRHP in Gallatin County
- Crenshaw House (Crenshaw, Mississippi), listed on the NRHP in Panola County
- Crenshaw House (Richmond, Virginia), listed on the NRHP in Richmond
