= John T. Crenshaw =

American politician

John T. Crenshaw served in the California legislature and, during the American Civil War, he served in the United States Army.
