= 123rd Operations Group =

359th Fighter Group
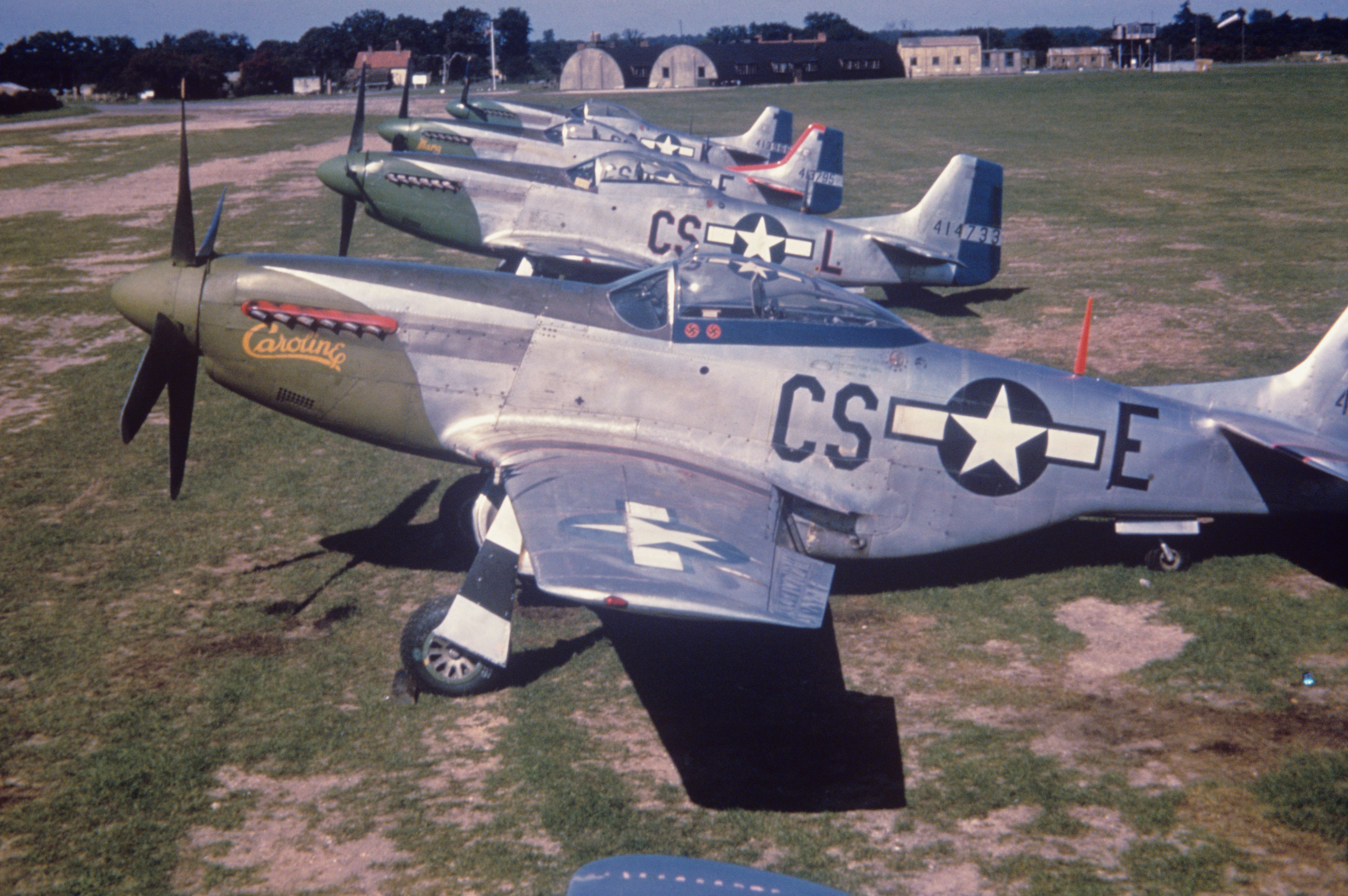
- P-51 Mustangs of the 359th Fighter Group
- Active: 1943–1945; 1947–1952; 1952–1958; 1962–present
- Country: United States
- Branch: United States Air Force
- Type: Group
- Role: fighter
- Mottos: Cum Leone Latin With the Lions (1943-1945); Fortunes Fortuna Juvat Latin Fortune Assists the Brave (after 1951)
- Engagements: European Theater of Operations
- Decorations: Distinguished Unit Citation; Air Force Outstanding Unit Award

Commanders
- Notable commanders: Avelin P. Tacon Jr.

Insignia
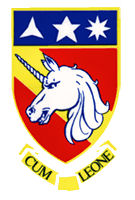
- 359th Fighter Group emblem

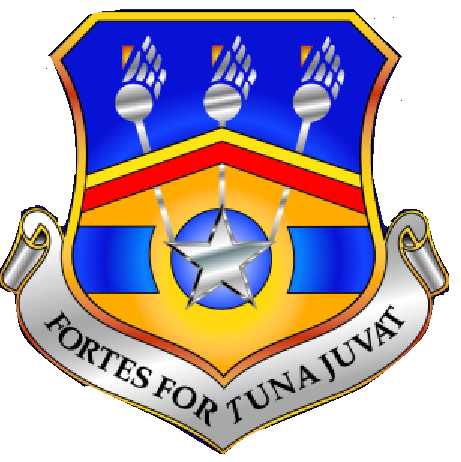
- 123d operations Group emblem (Note: Approved 20 December 1951.) (Note: The group uses the 123d Wing emblem with the group designation on the scroll. Air Force Instruction 84-105, Organizational Lineage, Honors and Heraldry, 19 March 2013, para 3.3.3.)

Aircraft flown
- Fighter: P-47 Thunderbolt 1943-45; P-51 Mustang 1944-45

The 359th Fighter Group was a United States Army Air Force fighter unit that was active during World War II. Following organization and training in the United States, the group deployed to the European Theater of Operations, operating from RAF East Wretham. The fighter group flew 346 combat missions over continental Europe and claimed 373 enemy aircraft in aerial combat and strafing attacks; probable destruction of 23; and damage to 185. It was awarded the Distinguished Unit Citation for its actions. The group flew its last mission on 20 April 1945, then returned to the United States for inactivation.

The group was redesignated the 123d Fighter Group and allotted to the National Guard in 1946. It was again activated in the fall of 1947 in the Kentucky Air National Guard. In the fall of 1950, the group was called to active duty and moved to Godman Air Force Base, Kentucky, where it became part of the 123d Fighter-Bomber Wing under the wing-base organization system. It returned to England in December 1951 and, as the 123d Fighter-Bomber Group, served until July 1952, when it transferred its mission, personnel and equipment to an active duty group, then moved without personnel or equipment back to the Kentucky Air National Guard, activating the same day. It served as a fighter unit in the 1950s, then became a tactical reconnaissance group, being called to active duty twice. It was inactivated in 1974, when the Air National Guard eliminated flying groups located on the same station as their parent wings, and its flying squadron was assigned directly to the 123d Wing. With the implementation of the Objective Wing organization in the 1990s, the group was activated under its current name, the 123d Operations Group.

== History ==
=== World War II ===
==== Organization and training ====
The group was activated in January 1943 at Westover Field, Massachusetts, with the 368th, 369th and 370th Fighter Squadrons assigned, although it apparently did not begin to receive personnel until March. After training with Republic P-47 Thunderbolts at Grenier Field, New Hampshire and Republic Field, New York, returning to Westover in August 1943. The group's personnel proceeded to Camp Kilmer, New Jersey on 2 October, where most of the group embarked on the USAT Argentina on 8 October, although the 369th Squadron sailed on the USS Thurston and SS Sloterdyjk, arriving at Liverpool and Clyde on 19 October.

==== Combat in Europe ====
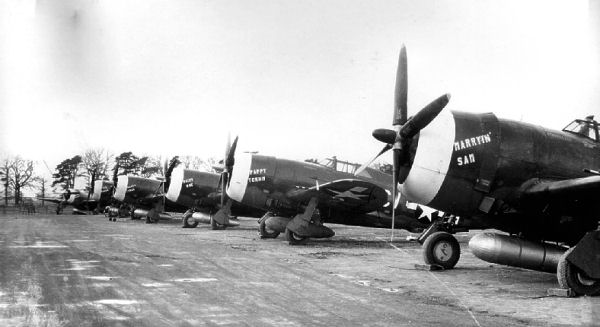
359th Fighter Group P-47 Thunderbolts (Note: Aircraft are Republic P-47D-5-RE Thunderbolts. In the foreground is serial 42-8596 (CV-P) "Marryin' Sam" of the 368th Fighter Squadron. Flown by Lt William R. Simmons, the aircraft was named from the Al Capp cartoon strip, Li'l Abner.)

The 359th entered combat in mid-December 1943 after five 359th pilots flew combat missions with the 78th Fighter Group. At first, the group engaged primarily in escort missions to cover Boeing B-17 Flying Fortress and Consolidated B-24 Liberator bombers that attacked airfields in France. It also flew patrol, strafing, dive bombing and weather reconnaissance missions.

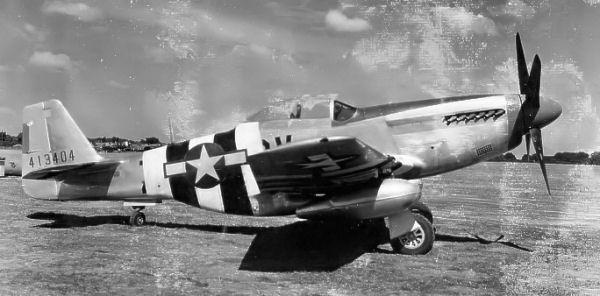
368th Fighter Squadron P-51 Mustang (Note: Aircraft is North American P-51D-5-NA Mustang. serial 44-13404 (CV-Z), painted in D-Day Invasion markings, June 1944. The pilot of this aircraft, Lt. Louis E. Barnett, was killed on 12 September 1944.)

In April 1944, the group began converting to the North American P-51 Mustang, whose extended range permitted it to provide escort for bombers that struck rail centers in Germany and oil targets in Poland. With the Mustang, the group supported Operation Overlord, the invasion of Normandy, by patrolling the English Channel, escorting bomber formations to the French coast, and dive bombing and strafing bridges, locomotives, and rail lines near the battle area.

From July 1944 until February 1945, the group engaged chiefly in escorting bombers to oil refineries, marshalling yards, and other targets in such cities as Berlin, Brux, Frankfurt am Main, Ludwigshafen, Merseburg and Stuttgart. The group received a Distinguished Unit Citation for operations over Germany on 11 September 1944 when the group protected a formation of heavy bombers against large numbers of enemy fighters.

In addition to its escort duties, the 359th supported campaigns in France during July and August 1944, bombed enemy positions to support Operation Market Garden, the airborne attempt to size a bridgehead across the Rhine near Nijmegen in September, and participated in the Battle of the Bulge in December 1944 and January 1945. The group flew missions to support Operation Varsity, the airborne attack to seize a bridgehead across the Rhine at Wesel in March 1945. It also escorted medium bombers attacking German lines of communication from February 1945 through April.

Following V-E Day, the 359th Fighter Group remained in England until November 1945, although most of its personnel were transferred to other unit, and its aircraft shipped to depots. It sailed on the RMS Queen Mary on 4 November. It arrived at Camp Kilmer, New Jersey, where it was inactivated on 10 November 1945.

==== Notable pilots ====
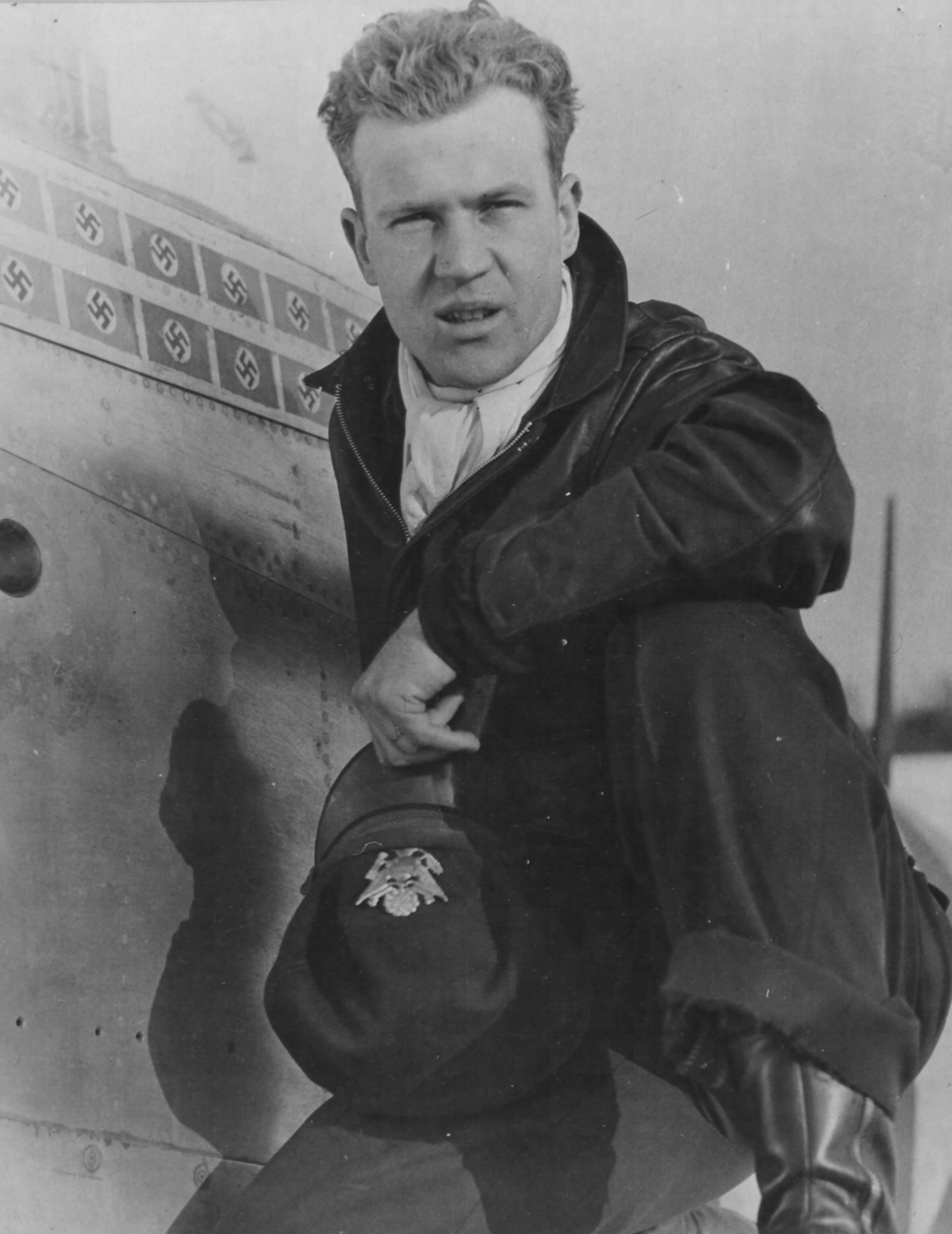
Major Ray Wetmore of the 370th Fighter Squadron

Ray Wetmore was credited with 21.25 victories in aerial combat and ended the war as a 21-year-old major. His last victory was on March 15, 1945, near Wittenberg, destroying a Messerschmitt Me 163 Komet rocket fighter.

Avelin P. Tacon Jr. was commander of the 359th Fighter Group and went on to become a major general in the US Air force.

Howard L. Fogg, an American artist specializing in railroad art, flew 76 combat missions with the 359th Fighter Group and was awarded the Air Medal with three clusters and the Distinguished Flying Cross with one cluster.

George A. "Pop" Doersch. was the 359th Fighter Group's second highest ranking ace with 10.5 victories in aerial combat (according to USAAF and Imperial Air Museum records) and other sources. Major Doersch flew 78 missions between April 1943 (many in his personal P-51B named "Mis Pop") and July 1944, when returned to the Zone of the Interior. Returning to combat on 20 September 1944, he flew another 69 missions, most in a Mustang P-51D (a replica "OLE GOAT" hangs in the Wisconsin Veterans Museum in Madison). Doersch flew over 500 hours in the ETO, which __ Most of his victories were German Bf 109 and Fw 190 fighters. After World War II he went on to serve in the Strategic Air Command until 1967, retiring from the USAF as a full Colonel.

Claude J. Crenshaw was the 359th Fighter Group's fourth highest ranking ace with seven victories in aerial combat. Crenshaw flew 270 combat hours between April 1944 and December 1944 in ETO, and his personal P-51 was named 'Louisiana Heatwave'. After World War II, he continued served in the USAF until 1965, retiring at the rank of Lieutenant Colonel.

=== Air National Guard ===
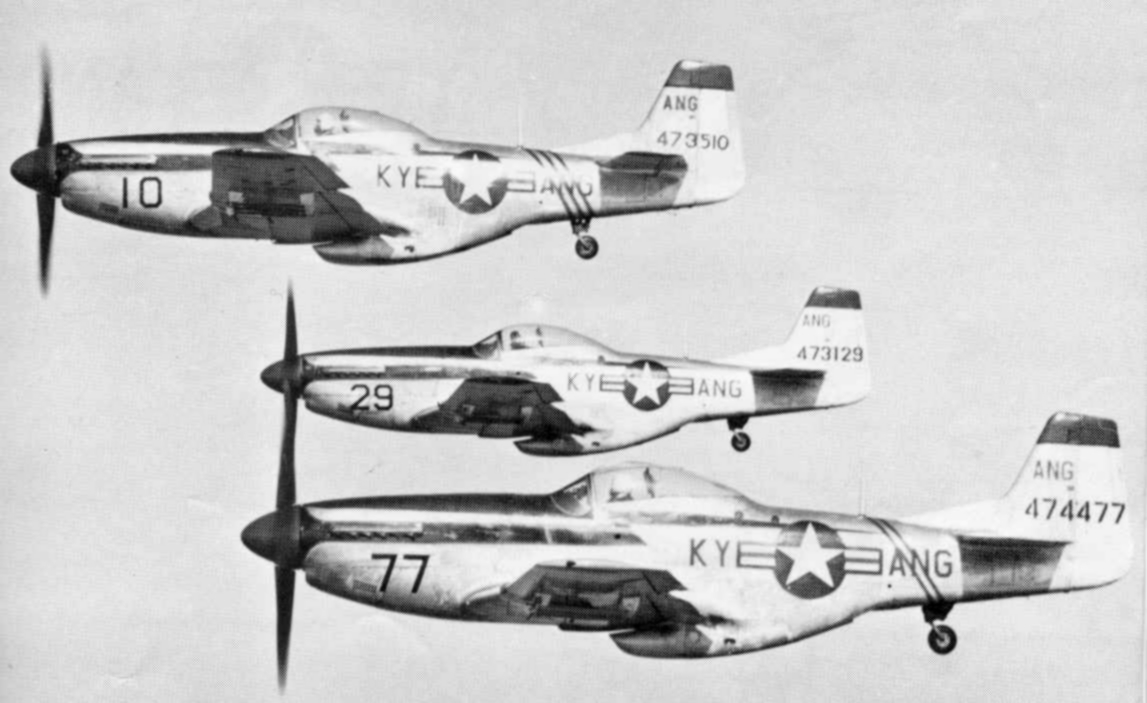
F-51Ds of the Kentucky Air National Guard

The group was redesignated 123d Fighter Group and allotted to the National Guard on 24 May 1946. It was organized at Standiford Field, Louisville, Kentucky, and was extended federal recognition on 28 September 1947. Upon mobilization, he unit would be gained by Tenth Air Force of Continental Air Command. Upon activation, the group was assigned two of its former squadrons. The 165th Fighter Squadron (the former 368th Fighter Squadron) was located with group headquarters at Standiford Field and the 167th Fighter Squadron (the former 369th Fighter Squadron) was at Kanawha County Airport, West Virginia. The following year, the 156th Fighter Squadron at Morris Field, North Carolina was assigned as the group's third operational squadron. The group was again equipped with Mustangs. Administrative and logistics support for the group was supplied by the 223d Air Service Group, which had detachments at each operational squadron's location. In 1949, the unit earned its first Spaatz Trophy, an award given each year to the premier Air National Guard flying unit.

==== Korean War mobilization ====
After the surprise invasion of South Korea on 25 June 1950, the group was mobilized into federal active duty on 10 October 1950. The group and 165th Squadron moved to Godman Air Force Base, Kentucky at Fort Knox, where they were joined by the 156th and 167th Fighter Squadrons. A few days later, the group was assigned to the newly organized 123d Fighter-Bomber Wing, which combined the group's operational elements and the 223d Air Service Group's support elements under the wing base organization of the regular Air Force. In December 1951, the group deployed with the wing to RAF Manston, England to replace a Strategic Air Command unit on temporary duty there. At Manston, the group transitioned into the Republic F-84E Thunderjet. On 20 July 1952, the group's federalization period expired and it was inactivated, transferring its personnel and equipment to the 406th Fighter-Bomber Group.

==== Return to state control ====
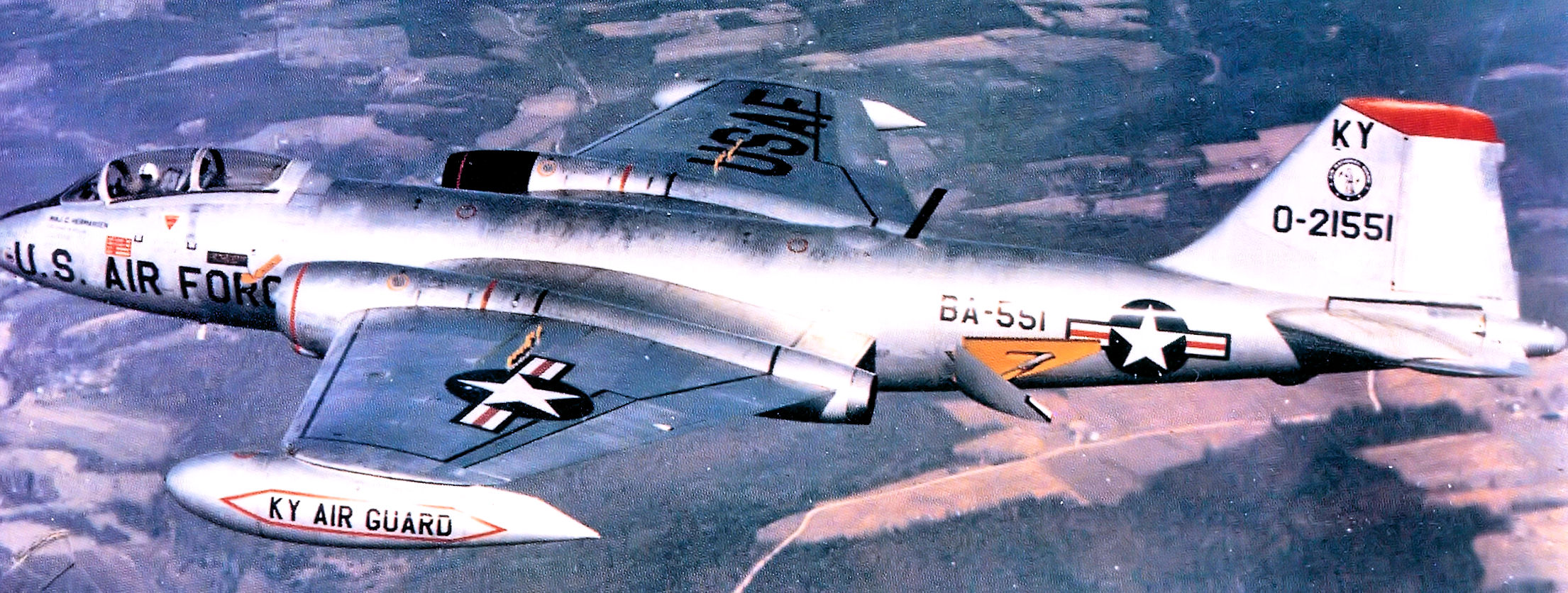
Group Martin B-57B Canberra, about 1963

The group was activated the same day in the Guard and returned to its familiar Mustangs. It again replaced them, this time with North American F-86 Sabres. In 1957, it transitioned into the reconnaissance role, initially with Martin RB-57A Canberras, but in 1965, with McDonnell RF-101 Voodoos.

In connection with the Pueblo Crisis, the group was again called to active duty in 1968. It was released to state control the following year. The group continued to operate Voodoos until 1974, when it was inactivated as the Air National Guard eliminated group headquarters that were located on the same stations as their parent wings, assigning their operational squadrons directly to the wings.

The group was activated again as the 123d Operations Group when the Guard reorganized under the Objective Wing model in 1993. It now operates Lockheed C-130 Hercules aircraft.

== Lineage ==
- Constituted as the 359th Fighter Group on 20 December 1942

Activated on 15 January 1943
Inactivated 10 November 1945
Redesignated 123d Fighter Group and allotted to the National Guard on 24 May 1946
Activated on 8 September 1947
Federally recognized on 28 September 1947
Called into active service on 10 October 1950
Redesignated 123d Fighter-Bomber Group on 26 October 1950
Inactivated and returned to state control on 10 July 1952
Redesignated 123d Fighter-Interceptor Group and activated on 10 July 1952
Redesignated 123d Fighter-Bomber Group on 1 January 1953
Redesignated 123d Fighter-Interceptor Group c. 1 July 1955

- Redesignated 123d Tactical Reconnaissance Group c. 1 June 1958
- Called into active service in January 1968
- Released from active service in July 1969

Inactivated on 9 December 1974

- Redesignated 123d Operations Group

Activated on 1 January 1993

=== Assignments ===
- Boston Air Defense Wing, 15 January 1943
- New York Air Defense Wing (later New York Fighter Wing), 11 July 1943
- Boston Air Defense Wing, 23 August 1943
- 66th Fighter Wing, 20 October 43
- 67th Fighter Wing, c. 1 November 1943 (attached to 1st Tactical Air Force, Provisional after November 1944)
- Army Service Forces, Port of Embarkation, 9 November 1945 – 10 November 1945
- Kentucky National Guard, 8 September 1947
- Kentucky Air National Guard, 18 September 1947
- 55th Fighter Wing, 20 December 1947
- Tactical Air Command, 10 October 1950
- 123d Fighter-Bomber Wing, 26 October 1950 – 10 July 1952
- 123d Fighter-Interceptor Wing (later 123d Fighter-Bomber Wing, 123d Fighter-Interceptor Wing), 10 July 1952 – c. 1 June 1958
- 123d Tactical Reconnaissance Wing, c. 1 October 1962 –9 December 1974
- 123d Airlift Wing, 1 January 1993 – present

=== Components ===
- 117th Tactical Reconnaissance Squadron, 10 April 1958 – c. June 1958
- 123d Operations Support Squadron, 1 January 1993 – present
- 156th Fighter Squadron (later 156th Fighter-Bomber Squadron, 156th Fighter-Interceptor Squadron), 1948 – 10 Jul 52, 10 July 1952 – c. 1 June 1958
- 166th Fighter-Bomber Squadron, c. 1 November 1952 – c. June 1953
- 368th Fighter Squadron (later 165th Fighter Squadron, 165th Fighter-Bomber Squadron, 165th Fighter-Interceptor Squadron, 165th Fighter-Bomber Squadron, 165th Fighter-Interceptor Squadron, 165th Tactical Reconnaissance Squadron, 165th Airlift Squadron), 15 January 1943 – 10 November 1945, 8 September 1947 – 10 July 1952, 10 July 1952 – c. 1 June 1958, c. 1 October 1962 – January 1968, c. 30 June 1969 – 9 December 1974, 1 January 1993 – present
- 369th Fighter Squadron (later 167th Fighter Squadron, 167th Fighter-Bomber Squadron, 167th Fighter-Interceptor Squadron, 167th Fighter-Bomber Squadron, 167th Fighter-Interceptor Squadron), 15 January 1943 – 10 November 1945, 8 September 1947 – 10 July 1952, 10 July 1952 – c. 1 June 1958
- 370th Fighter Squadron, 15 January 1943 – 10 November 1945

=== Stations ===
- Westover Field, Massachusetts, 15 January 1943
- Grenier Field, New Hampshire, 7 April 1943
- Republic Field, New York, 11 July 1943
- Westover Field, Massachusetts, 23 August – 3 October 1943
- RAF East Wretham (Sta 133), England, October 1943 – November 1945
- Camp Kilmer, New Jersey, 9–10 November 1945
- Standiford Field, Kentucky, 8 September 1947
- Godman Air Force Base, Kentucky, c. 20 October 1950 – 15 November 1951
- RAF Manston, 10 December 1951 – 10 July 1952
- Standiford Field, Kentucky, 10 July 1952
- Richards-Gebaur Air Force Base, Missouri, 30 January 1968
- Standiford Field, 9 June 1969 – present

=== Aircraft ===
- Republic P-47 Thunderbolt, 1943-1944
- North American P-51 Mustang, 1944–1945, 1946–1951; 1952–1956
- Republic F-84E Thunderjet, 1951–1952
- North American F-86A Sabre, 1956–1957
- Martin RB-57A Canberra, 1957–1965
- McDonnell RF-101 Voodoo, 1965–1976
- McDonnell RF-4C Phantom, 1976-1989
- Lockheed C-130B Hercules, 1989-1992
- Lockheed C-130H Hercules, 1992–present
