= Dave Crenshaw =

American author and public speaker

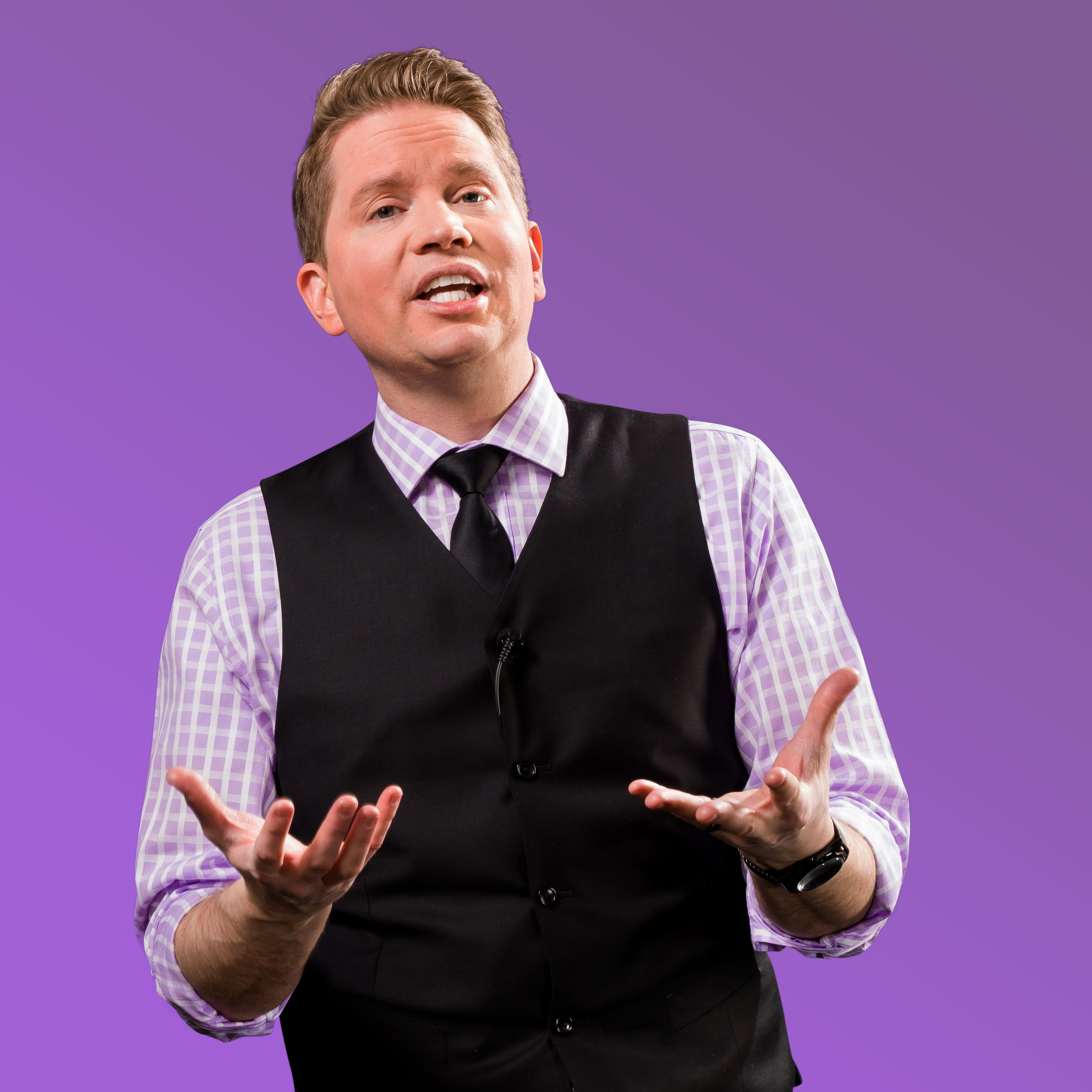
- Dave Crenshaw speaking at an event in 2017
- Born: 1975 (age 50–51)
- Education: Brigham Young University
- Occupations: Writer, speaker
- Known for: Writing, time management
- Notable work: The Myth of Multitasking, Invaluable, The Power of Having Fun
- Style: Interactive, humorous
- Website: davecrenshaw.com

Dave Crenshaw (born 1975) is an American author, public speaker, small business and time management expert. His books The Myth of Multitasking: How "Doing It All" Gets Nothing Done and Invaluable: The Secret to Becoming Irreplaceable have been referenced for teaching by some universities.

== Early life and education ==
Crenshaw earned his Bachelor of Science in business management from the Marriott School of Management at Brigham Young University in 2000. Early in his career, a clinical psychologist diagnosed Crenshaw with attention deficit hyperactivity disorder (ADHD).

== Career ==
Crenshaw began his career in 1998 as an independent consultant small businesses coaching firm.

The Myth of Multitasking: How "Doing It All" Gets Nothing Done was written by Crenshaw and published in 2008 by Jossey-Bass, an imprint of Wiley. Dennis Lythgoe described The Myth of Multitasking: How "Doing It All" Gets Nothing Done in the Deseret News as a candid and satirical little book that takes on one of the most talked about social myths of the modern scene – multitasking. Jossey-Bass also published Crenshaw's book, Invaluable: The Secret to Becoming Irreplaceable in 2010. Jim Pawlak summarized Invaluable: The Secret to Becoming Irreplaceable in the Silicon Valley Business Journal that Crenshaw provides a number of fill-in-the-blanks templates that help you identify your most valuable activities (MVAs) and manage time effectively. Crenshaw's book on entrepreneurship, The Focused Business: How Entrepreneurs Can Triumph Over Chaos was published in 2013. From 2013, he is a Lynda.com author and presenter of business skills courses, including "Time Management Fundamentals" and "Small Business Secrets".

He has published multiple courses on LinkedIn Learning, some of them have been cited in university newspapers. His views on multi-tasking has been often quoted by the BBC News, Forbes, and The Washington Post.

=== Other work ===
Crenshaw speaks frequently at conferences and industry events on the topics of business and time management, such as EO Alchemy 2012 — Seattle, Crown Council's 18th Annual Event, the 2013 REACH conference, Schnizzfest 2013, Behind Every Leader, TiE Silicon Valley and LTB 2014. His work has been featured on Lifehacker, The Ledger, Fast Company and The Guardian.

== Selected bibliography ==
- Crenshaw, Dave (2007). Multitasking Is Worse Than a Lie. Fresh Juice Books. ISBN 978-0-9799236-0-9.
- Crenshaw, Dave (2010). The Myth of Multitasking: How "Doing It All" Gets Nothing Done. John Wiley & Sons. ISBN 978-0-470-89348-7.
- Crenshaw, Dave (2010). Invaluable: The Secret to Becoming Irreplaceable. Wiley. ISBN 978-0-470-60943-9.
- Crenshaw, Dave (2017). The Power of Having Fun: How Meaningful Breaks Help You Get More Done. Berrett-Koehler Publishers. ISBN 978-1-5230-8354-1.
- Crenshaw, Dave (2017). Managing Your Calendar for Peak Productivity. linkedin.com.
- Crenshaw, Dave (2018). Time Management Fundamentals with Microsoft Office. linkedin.com.
- Crenshaw, Dave (2018). The Result: The Proven, Practical Formula for Getting What You Want. Invaluable Press. ISBN 978-0-9891936-4-1.
- Crenshaw, Dave (2018). Time Management: Working from Home. linkedin.com.
- Crenshaw, Dave (2018). The Focused Business: How Entrepreneurs Can Triumph Over Chaos. Invaluable Press. ISBN 978-0-9891936-5-8.
