= 370th Fighter Squadron =

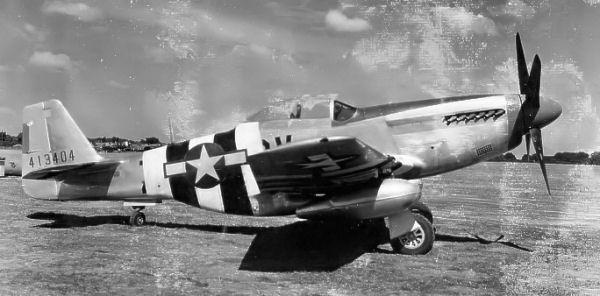
- 359th Fighter Group P-51 Mustang at RAF East Wretham
- Active: 1942–1945
- Country: United States
- Branch: United States Air Force
- Role: Fighter
- Engagements: European theater of World War II
- Decorations: Distinguished Unit Citation

Insignia
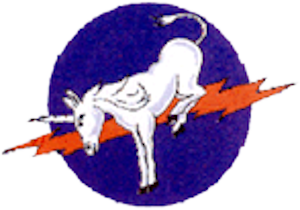
- 370th Fighter Squadron Emblem (approved 6 July 1943)
- ETO Fuselage Code and squadron color (Note: The 370th appears to be the only Eighth Air Force unit other than the squadrons of the 4th Fighter Group to have changed its fuselage code. Watkins, pp.78-79.): CR then CS; Blue

The 370th Fighter Squadron is an inactive United States Army Air Forces unit. The squadron was activated in early 1943 and assigned to the 359th Fighter Group. After training in the United States, it deployed to England and participated in combat in the European Theater of Operations, earning a Distinguished Unit Citation for its action. Following V-E Day, the squadron returned to at Camp Kilmer, New Jersey, where it was inactivated on 10 November 1945.

== History ==
The 370th Fighter Squadron was activated in early 1943 as one of the original three squadrons of the 359th Fighter Group. The squadron trained in New England during 1943.

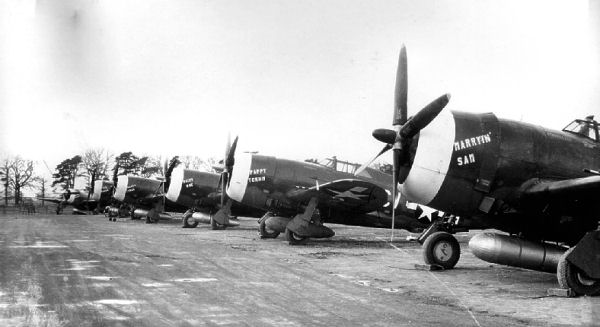
P-47 Thunderbolts of the 359th Fighter Group at East Wretham

The squadron moved to England in October 1943, where it became part of VIII Fighter Command. It entered combat in mid-December 1943, using the callsign "Wheeler" supported the invasion of Normandy during June 1944 by patrolling the English Channel, escorting bombardment formations to the French coast, and dive-bombing and strafing bridges, locomotives, and rail lines near the battle area. After D-Day, engaged chiefly in escorting bombers to oil refineries, marshalling yards, and other targets in such cities as Ludwigshafen, Stuttgart, Frankfurt, Berlin, Merseburg, and Brux. Continued combat operations until the German capitulation in May 1945. The unit returned to the United States and was inactivated in November 1945.

== Lineage ==
- Constituted as the 370th Fighter Squadron (Single Engine) on 20 December 1942

Activated on 15 January 1943
Inactivated on 10 November 1945

=== Assignments ===
- 359th Fighter Group, 15 January 1943 – 10 November 1945

=== Stations ===
- Westover Field, Massachusetts, 15 January 1943
- Bedford Army Air Field, Massachusetts, 5 April 1943
- Mitchel Field, New York, 24 May 1943
- Westover Field, Massachusetts, 22 August 1943 – 2 October 1943
- RAF East Wretham (Station 133), England, ca. 18 October 1943 – ca. 4 November 1945
- Camp Kilmer, New Jersey, 9 November 1945 – 10 November 1945

=== Aircraft ===
- Republic P-47 Thunderbolt, 1943–1944
- North American P-51 Mustang, 1944–1945

=== Awards and campaigns ===
Award streamer	Award	Dates	Notes
	Distinguished Unit Citation	11 September 1944	Germany

Manual campaign table

Campaign Streamer	Campaign	Dates	Notes
	Air Offensive, Europe		
	Normandy		
	Northern France		
	Rhineland		
	Ardennes-Alsace		
	Central Europe		
	Air Combat, EAME Theater		
