= Jonathan Crenshaw =

American artist (1972–2023)

Johanthan Crenshaw
- Born: Johanthan Dale Crenshaw; 1972; South Beach, Florida, U.S.
- Died: May 12, 2023 (aged 51)
- Occupations: Painter, entertainer, busker
- Years active: 2011–2023

Jonathan Dale Crenshaw (1972 – May 12, 2023) was an American artist and homeless man from South Beach, Florida. He was born without arms and entertained bystanders and tourists of the area by creating paintings and art pieces with his feet as he trained himself to do. He was briefly in one of "Dave Portnoy's One Bite Pizza Reviews".

== Arrest ==
In 2018, he was charged with stabbing 22-year-old Cesar Coronado in Miami, a tourist from Chicago with scissors and chasing him down the street. He was charged with aggravated battery but was released after the trial. According to him, Cesar punched him and he acted in self-defense. A video of the incident went viral on social media.

== Death ==
Crenshaw died on May 12, 2023 of esophageal varices. The Miami New Times announced his death on March 25, 2024.
