= RAF East Wretham =

Former RAF station in Norfolk, England

RAF East Wretham USAAF Station 133
- Thetford, Norfolk in England
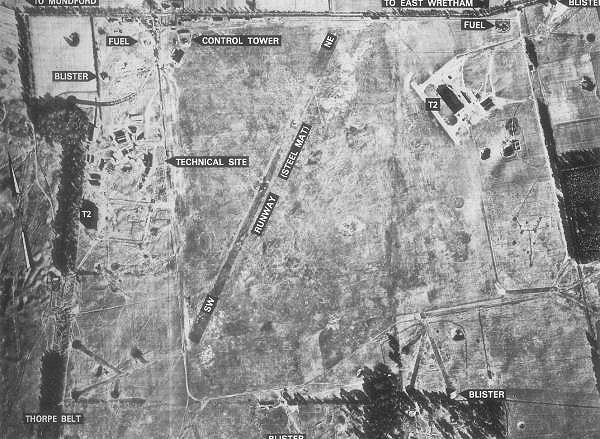
- East Wretham Airfield - 5 February 1946

Site information
- Type: Royal Air Force station
- Code: UT
- Owner: Ministry of Defence
- Operator: Royal Air Force; United States Army Air Forces; British Army
- Controlled by: RAF Bomber Command * No. 3 Group RAF; Eighth Air Force

Location
- Shown within Norfolk RAF East Wretham (the United Kingdom)
- Coordinates: 52°28′10.92″N 000°49′15.70″E

Site history
- Built: 1939
- In use: March 1940 - July 1946 as airfield now part of STANTA
- Battles/wars: European theatre of World War II

Airfield information
- Elevation: 41 metres (135 ft) AMSL
Runways
Direction	Length and surface
00/00	Grass
00/00	Grass
00/00	Grass

Royal Air Force East Wretham or more simply RAF East Wretham is a former Royal Air Force station located 6 miles (9.7 km) northeast of Thetford, Norfolk, England.

== History ==
=== Royal Air Force use ===
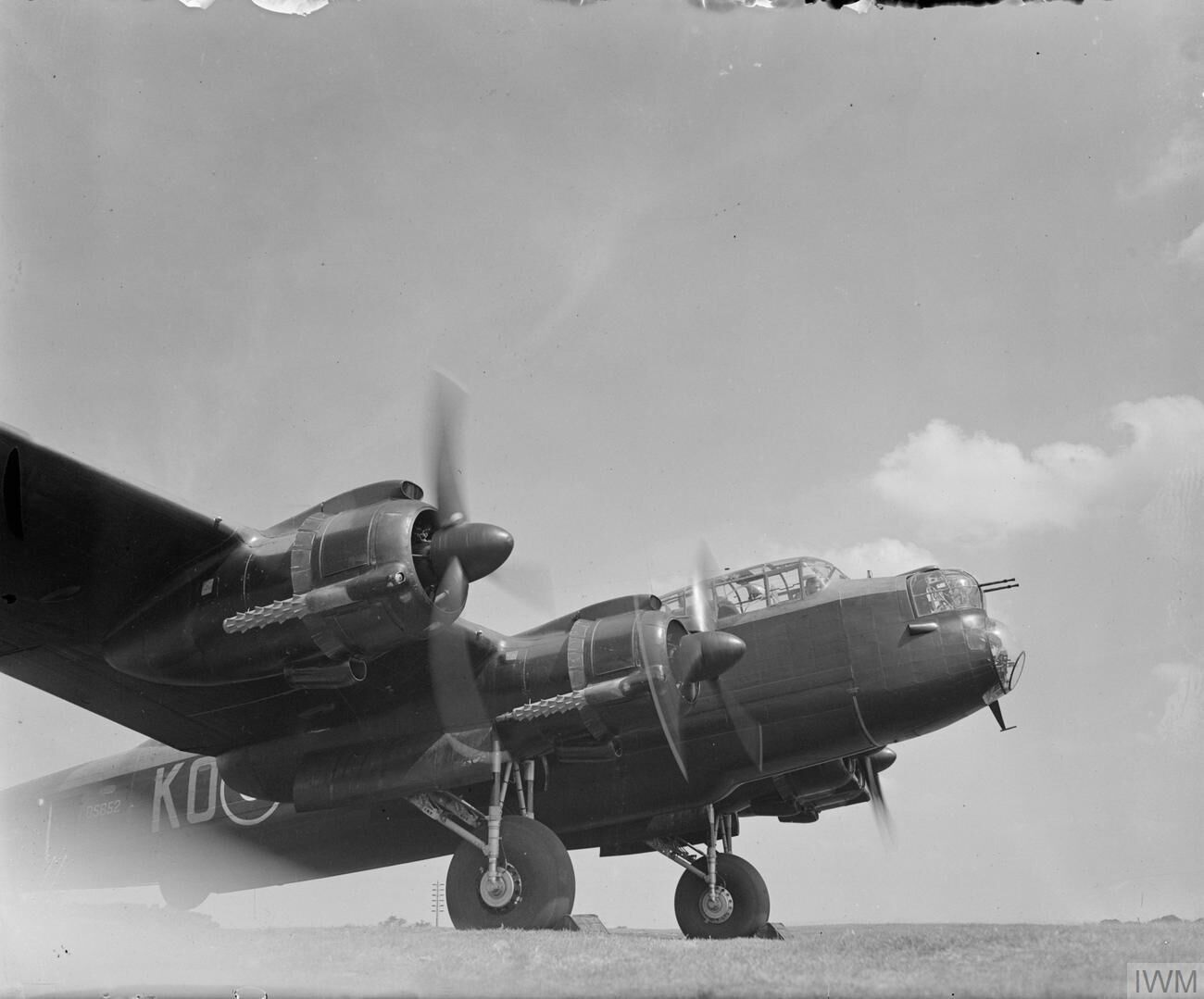
Engine testing on a Lancaster B Mark II of 115 Squadron at RAF East Wretham, 1943

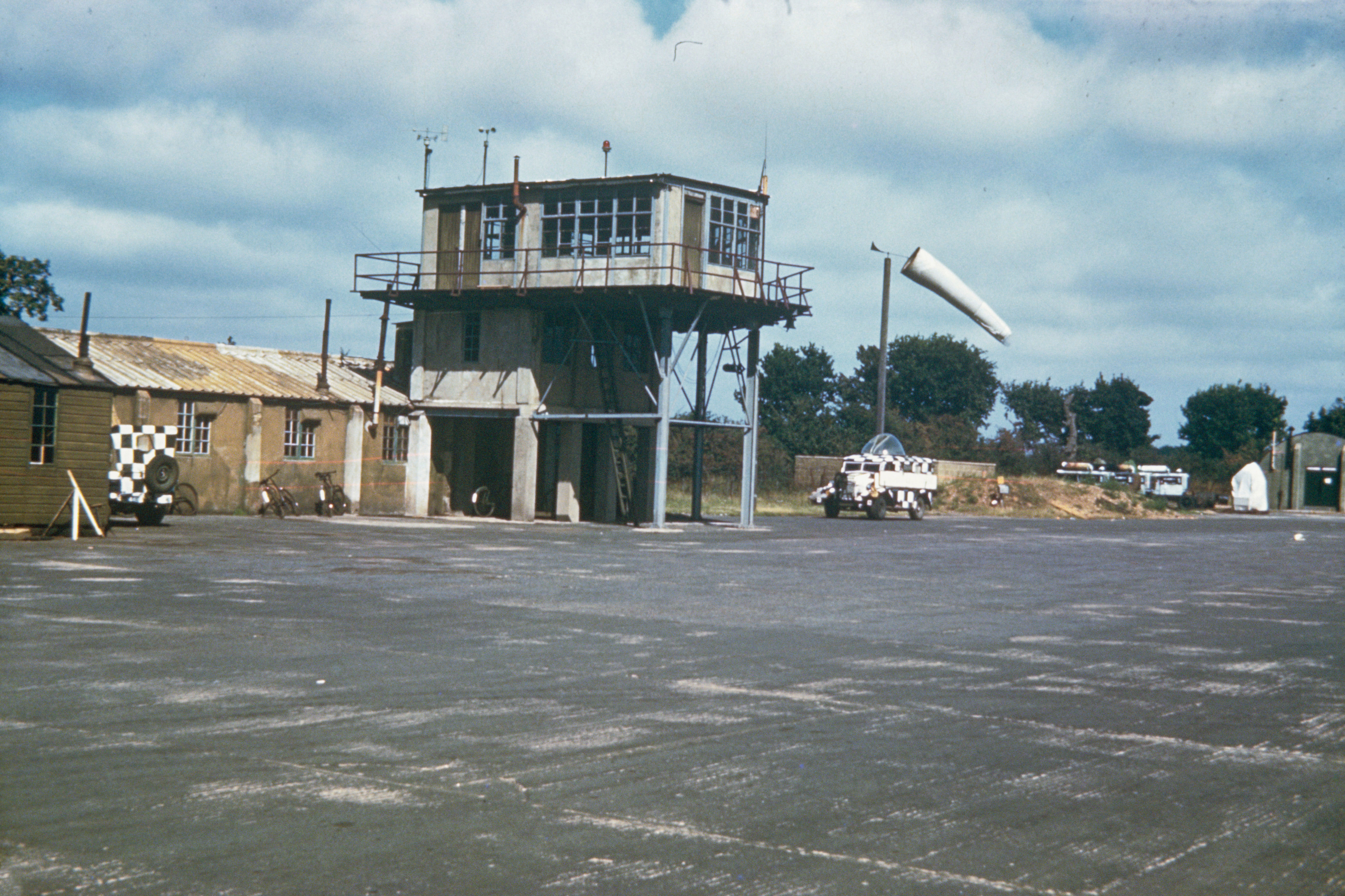
Control tower at RAF East Wretham

East Wretham airfield was hurriedly brought into service during the early years of the Second World War as a satellite airfield with No. 311 (Czechoslovak) Squadron RAF dispersed there from RAF Honington on 29 July 1940. A more permanent allocation followed in September. The squadron operated their bombers from the airfield until April 1942 when it transferred to Coastal Command. Later, RAF Bomber Command No. 115 Squadron RAF, operating Vickers Wellington Mk IIIs and later Avro Lancasters, occupied the airfield from November 1942.

Sydney Percival Smith, a Royal Canadian Air Force pilot flying Wellingtons in 115 Squadron, says East Wretham in late 1942 was ".. a fully operational station complete with ammunition dumps, hangar repair shops, barracks, messes, and briefing rooms." He describes flying on missions directed at targets in Germany (including Bremen, Stuttgart, Frankfurt and Munich) and Italy (Turin), as well as mine laying in French ports (Le Havre, Brest, St. Nazaire, and Lorient) and the Bay of Biscay.

A plan to turn East Wretham into a "Class A" airfield was not carried through, the bomber unit moved to Little Snoring and the station turned over to the USAAF for fighter operations.

Units

- No. 1429 (Czech Operational Training) Flight RAF (January - June 1942)
- Detachment of No. 1657 Heavy Conversion Unit RAF (March - May 1943)
- No. 1678 Heavy Conversion Flight RAF
- No. 2715 Squadron RAF Regiment
- No. 2724 Squadron RAF Regiment
- No. 4243 Anti-Aircraft Flight RAF Regiment

=== United States Army Air Forces use ===
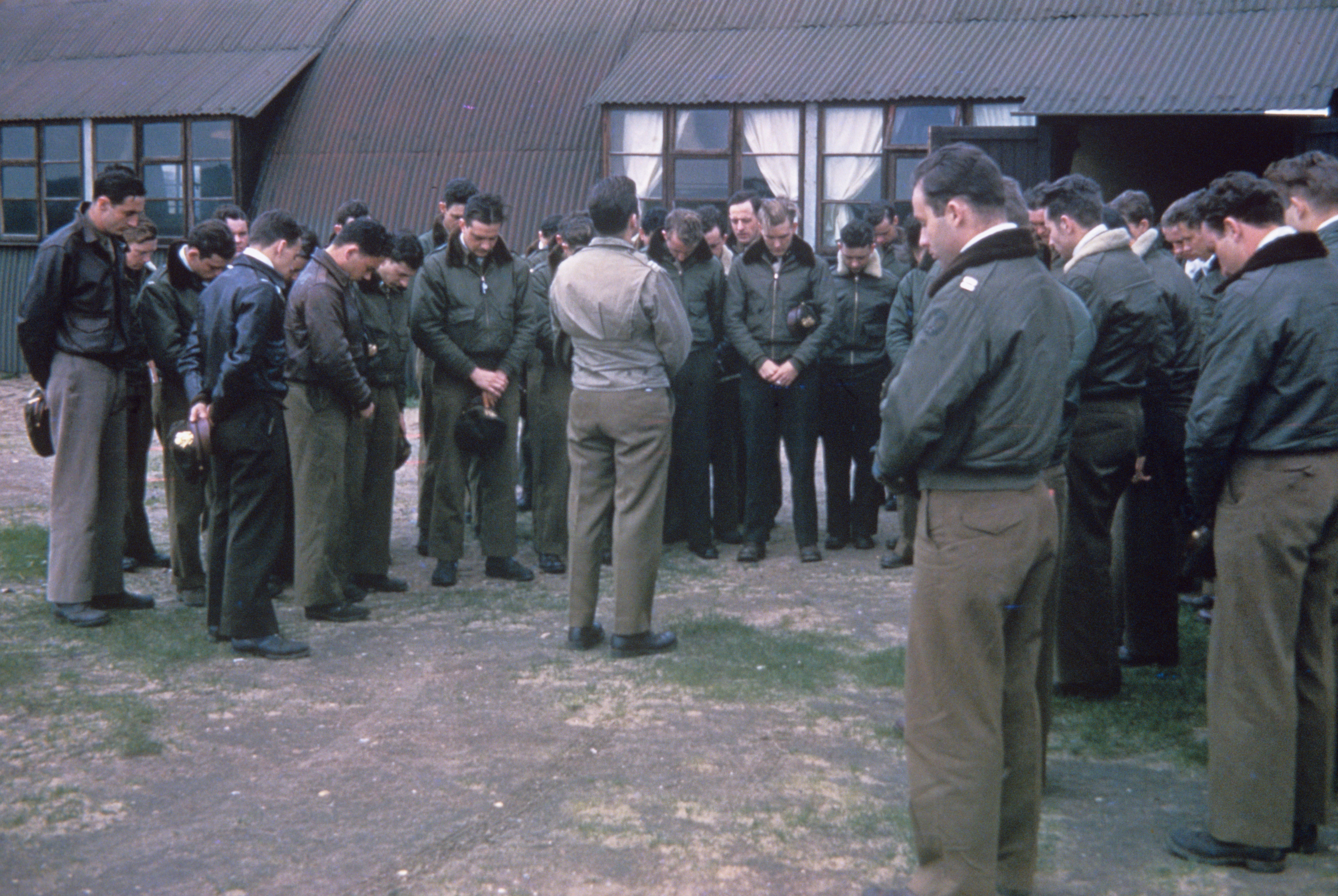
Captain Wilbur C. Ziegler, station Chaplain, leads pilots of the 359th Fighter Group in prayer at East Wretham.

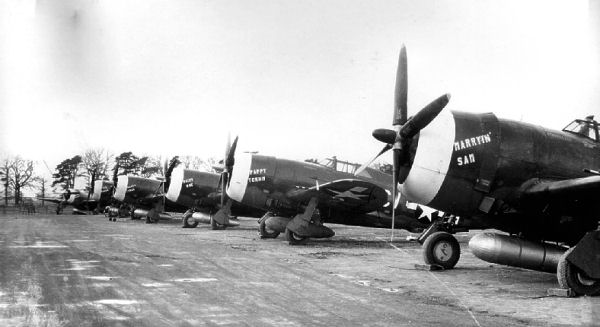
Republic P-47D-5-RE Thunderbolts of the 359th Fighter Group. Foreground is Serial 42-8596 "Marryin' Sam" of the 368th Fighter Squadron.

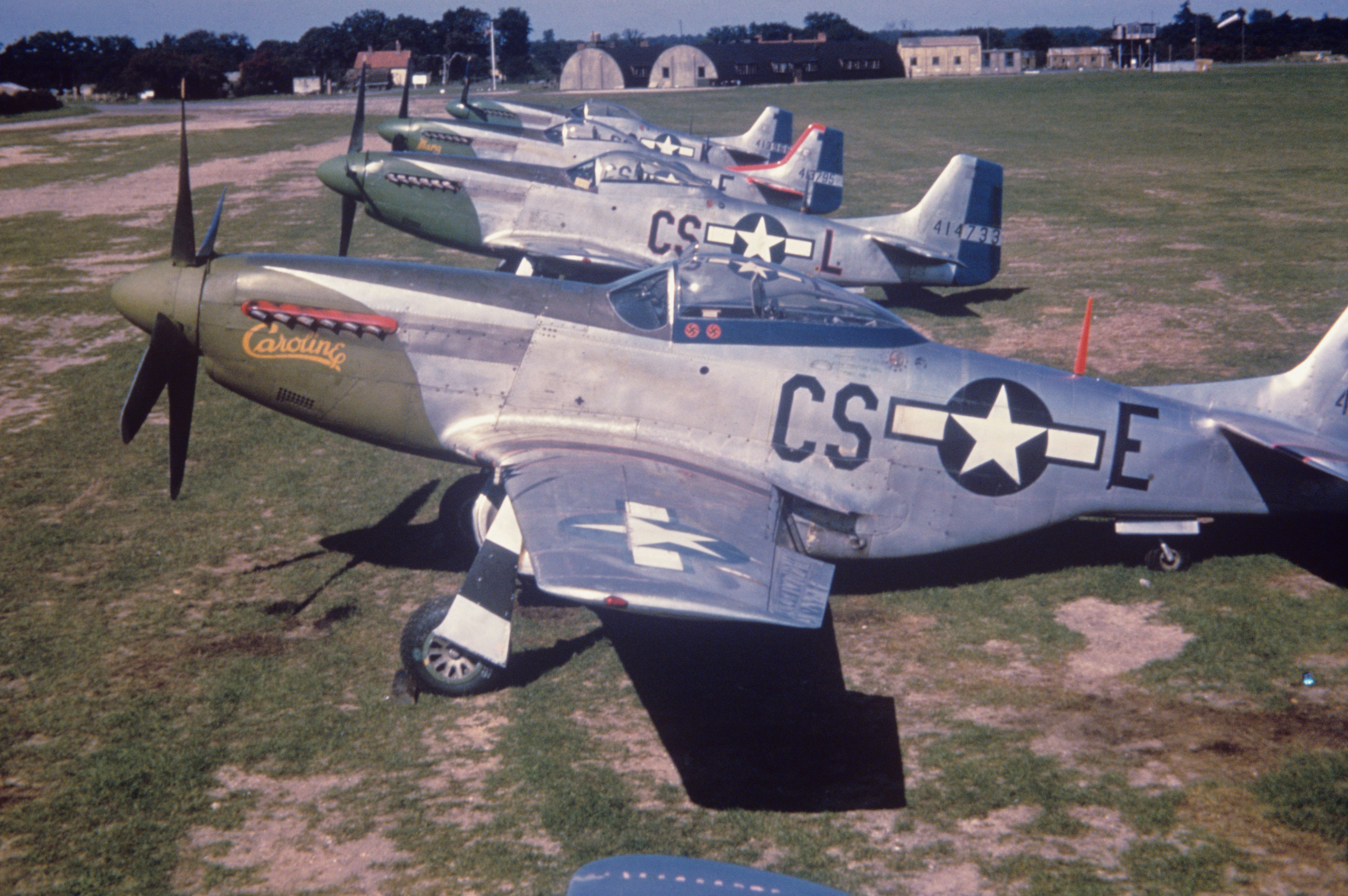
370th Fighter Squadron North American P-51Ds parked on the line in 1944.

In October 1943, East Wretham was assigned USAAF designation Station 133 and was allocated to the United States Army Air Forces Eighth Air Force.

USAAF Station Units assigned to RAF East Wretham were:

- 85th Service Group

394th and 395th Service Squadrons; HHS 85th Service Group

- 18th Weather Squadron
- 49th Station Complement Squadron
- 1065th Quartermaster Company
- 1101st Signal Company
- 1141st Military Police Company
- 1833rd Ordnance Supply & Maintenance Company
- 2040th Engineer Fire Fighting Platoon

==== 359th Fighter Group ====
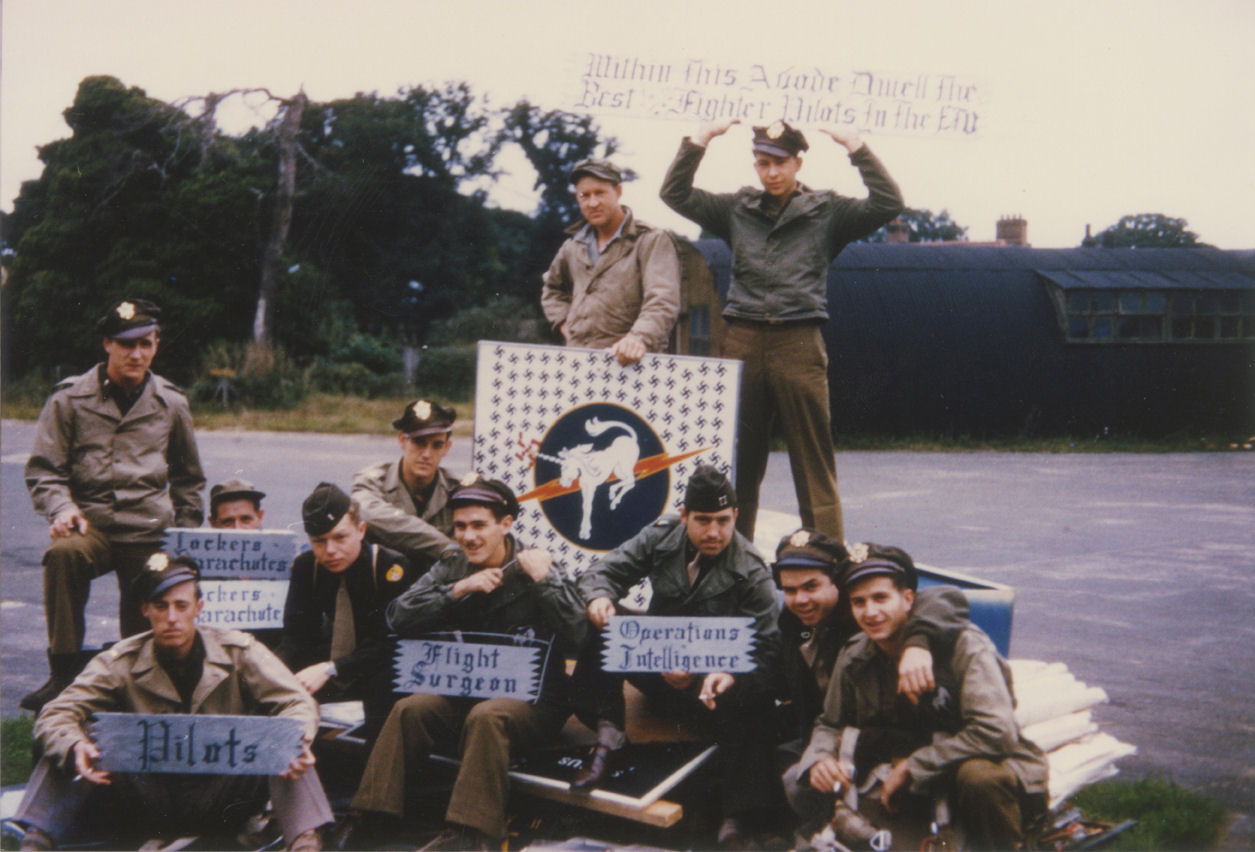
Personnel of the 359th Fighter Group with the insignia of the 370th Fighter Squadron and signage that has been taken down at East Wretham during the V-E Day celebration, 7 May 1945

The first American tenants at East Wretham were the 359th Fighter Group, being reassigned from Westover AAF Massachusetts. The group was under the command of the 67th Fighter Wing of the VIII Fighter Command. Aircraft of the 359th were identified by green around their cowlings and tails.

The group consisted of the following squadrons:

- 368th Fighter Squadron (CV)
- 369th Fighter Squadron (IV)
- 370th Fighter Squadron (CS)

The 359th FG entered combat in mid-December 1943 after some of the pilots had already flown combat missions with another fighter group. It began operations with Republic P-47 Thunderbolts, later converting to North American P-51 Mustangs in April 1944. In combat the group flew escort, patrol, strafing, dive-bombing, and weather-reconnaissance missions. At first, it was engaged primarily in escort activities to cover Boeing B-17 Flying Fortress and Consolidated B-24 Liberator bombers that attacked airfields in France, and later expanded their area of operations to provide escort for bombers that struck rail centers in Germany and oil targets in Poland.

The group supported the invasion of Normandy during June 1944 by patrolling the English Channel, escorting bombardment formations to the French coast, and dive-bombing and strafing bridges, locomotives, and rail lines near the battle area.

During the period July 1944 - February 1945, the group was engaged chiefly in escorting bombers to oil refineries, marshalling yards, and other targets in such cities as Ludwigshafen, Stuttgart, Frankfurt, Berlin, Merseburg, and Brux. The 359th FG received a Distinguished Unit Citation for operations over Germany on 11 September 1944 when the group protected a formation of heavy bombers against large numbers of enemy fighters.

In addition to its escort duties, the 359th supported campaigns in France during July and August 1944, bombed enemy positions to support the airborne invasion of the Netherlands in September, and participated in the Battle of the Bulge (December 1944-January 1945). The group flew missions to support the assault across the Rhine in March 1945, and escorted medium bombers that attacked various communications targets, February–April 1945.

The 359th Fighter Group returned to Camp Kilmer, New Jersey and was inactivated on 10 November 1945.

== Current ==
Initially after the war ended, the field was used by the RAF as a Polish resettlement camp. With the refugees resettled by 1946, East Wretham was closed as an active airfield and became part of the British Army's Stanford Practical Training Area (also known as STANTA).

This huge training area in Norfolk has facilities for the live firing of artillery, mortars, anti-tank and machine guns as well as for dry training and bivouacking. Tanks are used during restricted periods from July to September. There are also facilities for parachuting, air-to-ground attacks and other training involving aircraft.

Many of the original World War II airfield buildings still stand, including one of the T2 hangars.

== See also ==
- List of former Royal Air Force stations
