= National Register of Historic Places listings in Jefferson County, Pennsylvania =

Location of Jefferson County in Pennsylvania

Jefferson County, Pennsylvania, United States, has 15 properties and districts listed on the National Register of Historic Places.

The locations of National Register properties and districts for which the latitude and longitude coordinates are included below may be seen in a map.

This National Park Service list is complete through NPS recent listings posted September 4, 2026.

== Current listings ==
	Name on the Register	Image	Date listed	Location	City or town	Description
1	Brockwayville Passenger Depot, Buffalo, Rochester and Pittsburgh Railroad	Brockwayville Passenger Depot, Buffalo, Rochester and Pittsburgh Railroad	May 29, 2003 (#03000489)	Alexander Street at Fourth Avenue; 41°15′04″N 78°47′36″W	Brockway	
2	Brookville Historic District	Brookville Historic District	June 7, 1984 (#84003409)	Roughly bounded by railroad tracks, Franklin Avenue, Church and Main Streets; 41°09′37″N 79°04′58″W	Brookville	
3	Brookville Presbyterian Church and Manse	Brookville Presbyterian Church and Manse	November 26, 1982 (#82001538)	White and Main Streets; 41°09′40″N 79°05′00″W	Brookville	
4	Clear Creek State Park Day Use District	Clear Creek State Park Day Use District	February 11, 1987 (#87000018)	4 miles (6.4 km) north of Sigel on Pennsylvania Route 949; 41°19′23″N 79°04′46″W	Heath Township	
5	Clear Creek State Park Family Cabin District	Clear Creek State Park Family Cabin District	February 12, 1987 (#87000106)	4 miles (6.4 km) north of Sigel on Pennsylvania Route 949; 41°20′00″N 79°06′07″W	Barnett Township	
6	Gray-Taylor House	Gray-Taylor House	August 3, 1979 (#79002244)	9 Walnut Street; 41°09′46″N 79°05′01″W	Brookville	
7	Joseph E. Hall House	Joseph E. Hall House	December 13, 1978 (#78002408)	419 West Main; 41°09′39″N 79°05′04″W	Brookville	
8	Herpel Brothers Foundry and Machine Shop	Herpel Brothers Foundry and Machine Shop	August 4, 2004 (#04000806)	45 West Main Street; 41°05′59″N 78°53′36″W	Reynoldsville	
9	Jefferson Theater	Jefferson Theater	May 9, 1985 (#85001001)	230 North Findley Street; 40°56′41″N 78°58′17″W	Punxsutawney	
10	Joseph Knapp Hotel and Store		April 26, 2018 (#100002371)	15285 Pennsylvania Route 28; 41°08′03″N 79°09′10″W	Clover Township	
11	T. M. Kurtz House	T. M. Kurtz House	July 28, 1988 (#88001158)	312 West Mahoning Street; 40°56′35″N 78°58′22″W	Punxsutawney	
12	Christian Miller House	Christian Miller House	January 9, 1995 (#94001565)	233 West Mahoning Street; 40°56′34″N 78°58′28″W	Punxsutawney	
13	Redferd Segers House	Redferd Segers House	May 5, 2000 (#00000447)	U.S. Route 219, opposite Township Route 1025; 41°14′49″N 78°46′02″W	Snyder Township	
14	Phillip Taylor House	Phillip Taylor House	July 22, 1982 (#82003790)	Euclid Avenue; 41°09′04″N 79°04′49″W	Brookville	
15	United States Post Office-Punxsutawney	United States Post Office-Punxsutawney	November 22, 2000 (#00001428)	201 North Findley Street; 40°56′41″N 78°58′20″W	Punxsutawney	

== See also ==
- List of National Historic Landmarks in Pennsylvania
- National Register of Historic Places listings in Pennsylvania
- List of Pennsylvania state historical markers in Jefferson County
