= Cobelli =

Cobelli is an Italian surname. Notable people with the surname include:

- Giancarlo Cobelli (1929–2012), Italian actor and stage director
- Gianna Cobelli (1936–2019), Italian actor
- Giovanni Cobelli (1849–1937), Italian civil servant and naturalist
- Giuseppina Cobelli (1898–1948), Italian opera singer
- Juan Manuel Cobelli (born 1988), Argentine footballer
- Leone Cobelli (c. 1425–1500), Italian painter and historian
- Ruggero Cobelli (1838–1921), Italian entomologist
- Sebastián Cobelli (born 1978), Argentine footballer
