= Kurtz House =

Kurtz House may refer to:

- Hill-Kurtz House, Griffin, Georgia, listed on the National Register of Historic Places in Spalding County, Georgia
- Kurtz-Van Sicklin House, Weiser, Idaho, listed on the National Register of Historic Places in Washington County, Idaho
- Kurtz House (Washington, Iowa), listed on the National Register of Historic Places in Washington County, Iowa
- T. M. Kurtz House, Punxsutawney, Pennsylvania, listed on the National Register of Historic Places in Jefferson County, Pennsylvania
- Adam Kurtz House, Winchester, Virginia, listed on the National Register of Historic Places in Winchester, Virginia
