= Carl C. Cable =

American public works engineer

Colonel Carl C. Cable PE (11 June 1911 to 6 May 1982), also known as Carl Cable and Carlos Cable, was an American public works engineer, energy research scientist, army officer and musician. He was one of the architects of the Public Works for Water and Power Development and Energy Research Appropriation Bill and Act 1977, regarded as part of the foundations of modern nuclear energy policy.

== Early life ==
Carl C. Cable was born on 11 June 1911 in Brookville, Pennsylvania, the son of Eugene Cobelli (later Cable), an immigrant from Friuli, Italy, and Margarite Payne. His grandfather was the naturalist Giovanni Cobelli, and the entomologist Ruggero Cobelli was his great-uncle. Cable received his degree in civil engineering at Drexel University before serving in the U.S. Army Corps of Engineers before, during, and after World War II. Cable reached the rank of Colonel and advised the OSS on amphibious operations in Europe.

== Public Works for Water and Power Development and Energy Research Appropriation Bill and Act ==
As a senior public official and maritime engineering consultant, Carl C. Cable was a prominent member of WEDA (Western Dredging Association), WODA (World Organization of Dredging Associations) and WODCON. U.S. Congressman Joe L. Evins, who Cable had served with in the army, pushed for Cable's involvement in the subcommittee of the Committee on Appropriations in the preparation for the Public Works for Water and Power Development and Energy Research Appropriation Bill from 1976 onwards. Cable was instrumental in writing the Public Works for Water and Power Development and Energy Research Appropriation Bill and Act, signed into law in 1976, a landmark piece of energy legislation.

== Music ==
Cable was an accomplished saxophonist who occasionally played with and mentored Tim Eyermann.

== Retirement ==
Carl C. Cable spent his retirement in Redondo Beach, California and later in a veterans' home in Haywood County, North Carolina, where he died aged 70, leaving no family, on 6 May 1982.
