= Brookville Historic District =

Brookville Historic District may refer to:

- Brookville Historic District (Brookville, Indiana), listed on the NRHP in Indiana
- Brookville Historic District (Brookville, Pennsylvania), listed on the NRHP in Pennsylvania
