= Arner =

Arner is a surname. Notable people with the surname include:

- Elias Arnér (born 1966), Swedish biochemist
- Gwen Arner, American television director and actress
- James G. Arner (born 1951), American judge
- Sivar Arnér (1909–1997), Swedish writer and playwright

== See also ==
- Louise Arner Boyd (1887–1972), American explorer
