= Bernardino Halbherr =

Italian entomologist

Bernardino Halbherr (21 July 1844, Rovereto – 31 March 1934, Rovereto) was an Italian entomologist who specialised in Coleoptera and Heteroptera.

Halbherr was an accountant. He worked closely with two other Rovereto naturalists Giovanni Cobelli and Ruggero Cobelli. His collection is in the Museo Civico Rovereto.
