= List of Pennsylvania state historical markers in Jefferson County =

Location of Jefferson County in Pennsylvania

This is a list of the Pennsylvania state historical markers in Jefferson County.

This is intended to be a complete list of the official state historical markers placed in Jefferson County, Pennsylvania by the Pennsylvania Historical and Museum Commission (PHMC). The locations of the historical markers, as well as the latitude and longitude coordinates as provided by the PHMC's database, are included below when available. There are 11 historical markers located in Jefferson County.

== Historical markers ==
Marker title	Image	Date dedicated	Location	Marker type	Topics
Charles J. Margiotti (1891–1956)		September 15, 2007	Calvary Cemetery, 444 S Main St. (PA 436), Punxsutawney; 40.93639°N 78.99108°W	Roadside	Ethnic & Immigration, Government & Politics 20th Century, Professions & Vocations
Cooksburg		September 17, 1954	PA 36 near Clarion River Bridge, Corsica (MISSING)	Roadside	Cities & Towns, Environment
Elijah Heath (1796–1875)		August 31, 2005	64 South Pickering Street, Brookville; 41.15965°N 79.0798°W	City	African American, Underground Railroad
First Pennsylvania Troopers Killed in the Line of Duty		May 2, 2016	Main Street (SR 310), just South of Ash Street (T-456), McCalmont Township; 41.006768°N 78.957516°W	Roadside	Law Enforcement, Crime
Great Shamokin Path		October 16, 1950	Buffalo-Pittsburgh Highway (US 119), 4 miles (6.4 km) northeast of Punxsutawney; 40.96348°N 78.91115°W	Roadside	French & Indian War, Native American, Paths & Trails, Religion, Transportation
Groundhog Day		September 11, 2004	At Gobbler's Knob, Woodland Avenue, 1.2 miles (1.9 km) from Route 36, Punxsutawney; 40.931282°N 78.95768°W	Roadside	Ethnic & Immigration, Folklore, Religion
Iroquois "Main Road"		October 6, 1950	PA 949, 3.8 miles (6.1 km) N of Corsica (MISSING)	Roadside	Native American, Paths & Trails, Roads, Transportation
Jefferson County		May 25, 1982	County Courthouse, Main Street (PA 28) near Pickering, Brookville; 41.16063°N 79.08019°W	City	Government & Politics, Government & Politics 19th Century
Lewis Earle Sandt (1888–1913)		June 15, 2009	42 South Pickering Street, Brookville	City	Exploration, Navigation, Transportation
Olean Road		October 16, 1950	Main Street (US 322), near Olean Road (PA 949), Corsica; 41.1809°N 79.2035°W	Roadside	Native American, Roads, Transportation
Ross Leffler School of Conservation		August 28, 2014	Game School Road & Empire Ridge Road, near Brockway; 41.280083°N 78.868750°W	Roadside	Education, Environment, Government & Politics 20th Century, Professions & Vocations, Sports & Recreation

== See also ==
- List of Pennsylvania state historical markers
- National Register of Historic Places listings in Jefferson County, Pennsylvania
