= Jefferson Theater =

Jefferson Theater may refer to:

- Jefferson Theater (Punxsutawney, Pennsylvania), historic theatre building
- Jefferson Theater (Virginia), a performing venue in Charlottesville, Virginia
- Jefferson Theatre, a performing venue in Beaumont, Texas
