= 1st Special Operations Squadron =

US Air Force military squadron

1st Special Operations Squadron

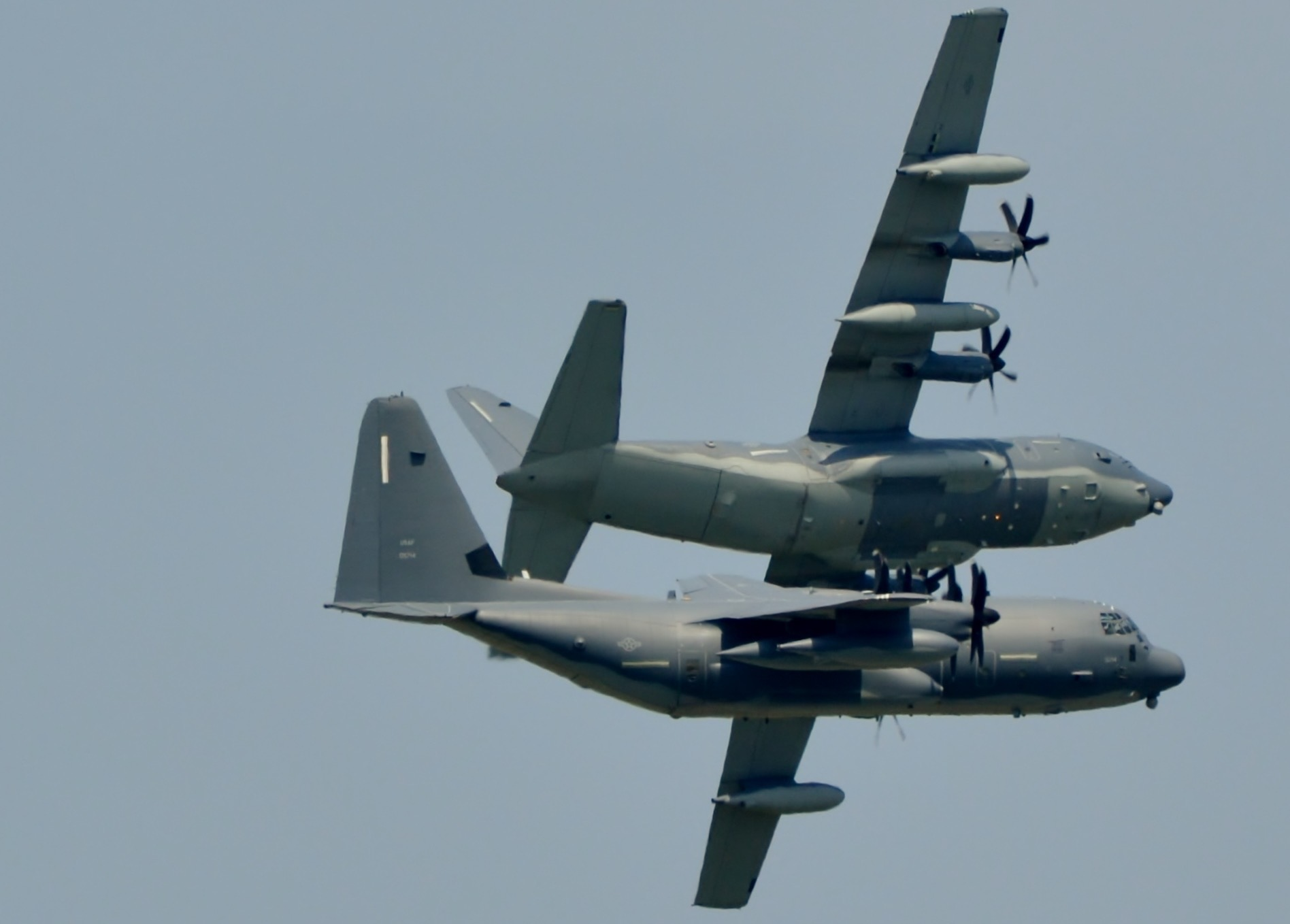
- MC-130J Commando II
- Active: 1939–1942; 1949–1952; 1953–1954; 1963–present
- Country: United States
- Branch: United States Air Force
- Role: Special Operations
- Part of: Air Force Special Operations Command
- Garrison/HQ: Kadena Air Base
- Decorations: Presidential Unit Citation; Air Force Outstanding Unit Award with Combat "V" Device; Air Force Meritorious Unit Award; Air Force Outstanding Unit Award; Republic of Vietnam Gallantry Cross with Palm

Insignia
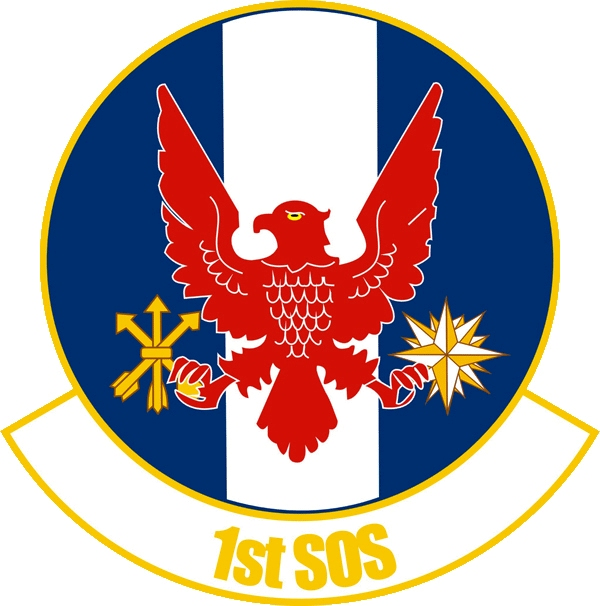
- 1st Special Operations Squadron emblem (approved 20 May 1966)

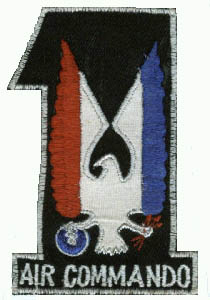
- Unofficial 1st Air Commando Squadron emblem

The 1st Special Operations Squadron is part of the 353d Special Operations Group at Kadena Air Base, Japan. It operates the MC-130J Commando II, providing special operation capabilities. Air crews are trained in night low-level flying, using night vision goggles to deliver troops and equipment into denied areas during adverse weather conditions at night by airdrop or landing.

== History ==
The 1st conducted gunnery testing and training from 1939 to 1942. It flew administrative airlift from 1949 to 1952 and 1953–1954.

The 1st flew combat missions in Southeast Asia from 8 July 1963 – 7 November 1972 and 15 December 1972 – 28 January 1973. It also trained South Vietnamese air force pilots in counter-insurgency operations from, July 1963 – November 1972. It acquired the Combat Talon mission from the redesignated 90th Tactical Fighter Squadron on 15 December 1972. Three MC-130 Combat Talons from the 1st SOS led the Night One mission of Operation Eagle Claw, the hostage rescue mission in Iran, in April 1980.

The 1st operated the MC-130H Combat Talon II aircraft until 2020, and now flies MC-130J Commando II aircraft in support of joint and allied special operations forces.

=== Vietnam War ===
The 1st Special Operations Squadron was originally constituted as the 1st Air Commando Squadron, Composite, and activated on 17 June 1963 under Pacific Air Forces. It organized on 8 July 1963 at Bien Hoa Air Base, South Vietnam, and was assigned to the 34th Tactical Group. It was reassigned the following year, on 8 July, to the 6251st Tactical Fighter Wing (although attached to the 3d Tactical Fighter Wing after 21 November 1965). Relocating to Pleiku Air Base, South Vietnam, it was reassigned to the 2d Air Division on 18 February 1966, and reassigned again to the 14th Air Commando Wing on 8 March 1966. Redesignated the 1st Air Commando Squadron, Fighter, on 15 August 1967, it was reassigned on 20 December 1967 to the 56th Air Commando Wing (redesignated the 56th Special Operation Wing in August 1968), and moved to Nakhon Phanom Royal Thai Navy Base, Thailand. On 1 August 1968 the 1st was redesignated as the 1st Special Operations Squadron.

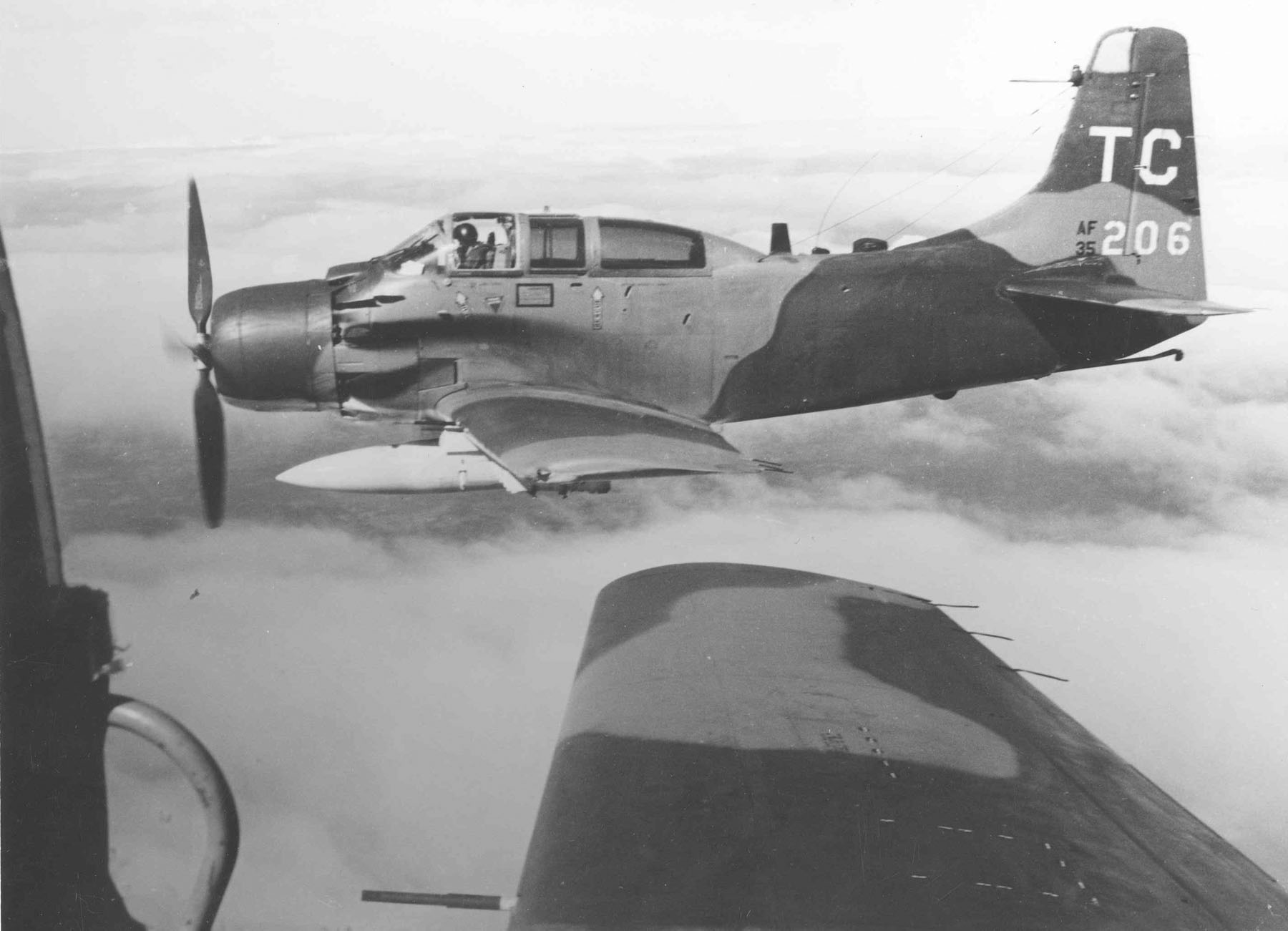
A-1E Skyraiders of the 1st SOS.

The 1st saw extensive combat in Southeast Asia, from 8 July 1963 – 7 November 1972 and from 15 December 1972 – 28 January 1973. In its early years in Southeast Asia, the squadron flew a variety of aircraft, beginning with the Douglas B-26 Invader and North American T-28 Trojan in 1963 and 1964, both aircraft used for close air support. While at its initial home base at Bien Hoa AB, aircrews of the 1st Air Commando Squadron performed the first combat tests of the famous Douglas FC-47 gunship, beginning in December 1964. In 1964 the 1st began flying the Douglas A-1 Skyraider, the aircraft with which it is most closely associated, but continued to fly other types into 1966. Its primary mission after the move to Nakhon Phanom RTAFB was interdiction along the Ho Chi Minh Trail, but its pilots and planes also flew cover for pilot rescue missions, and it continued to fly close air support missions for U.S. and Vietnamese ground forces. It also trained Vietnamese Air Force pilots in counterinsurgency operations, from July 1963 – November 1972. Aircraft flown by the 1st were the B-26 (1963–1964); North American T-28 Trojan (1963–1964); Helio U-10 Courier (1963–1966); Douglas C-47 Skytrain (1963–1966); RB–26 (1963–1964); A–1 (1964–1972); FC-47 (1964–1965); AC-47 (1965); and the C (later MC)-130 beginning in 1972.

Among its pilots was Major Bernard Francis Fisher, who was awarded the Medal of Honor for his heroic actions on 10 March 1966 over South Vietnam. In the first action of the Vietnam War that merited the award of the Air Force Cross, Captain Howard Rudolph Cody and his navigator First Lieutenant Atis Karlis Lielmanis both received the award posthumously for extraordinary heroism on 24 November 1963 while flying an A-26 out of Bien Hoa AB on a close air support mission. Two other early recipients of the Air Force Cross were Maj. Carl Berg Mitchell and his navigator, Capt. Vincent Joseph Hickman. Maj. Mitchell and Capt. Hickman were awarded the medal posthumously for an A-26 mission over Dong Nai Province on 14 January 1964. Capt. John Edgar Lackey received the award for extraordinary heroism during a search and rescue mission over Laos on 18 and 19 March 1972. The last pilot of the 1st to be awarded the Air Force Cross was Maj. James C. Harding, for extraordinary heroism in action near Tchepone, Laos from 10 to 13 April 1972.

=== Post-Vietnam operations ===
Following the end of combat operations at the end of 1972, the 1st was reassigned to the 18th Tactical Fighter Wing on 15 December 1972 and relocated to Kadena AB, Japan (although a segment of the squadron operated from Nakhon Phanom RTAFB until 28 January 1973). The squadron was reassigned to the 3rd Tactical Fighter Wing, on 15 January 1981, relocating in the process to Clark Air Base, Philippines. On 1 March 1983 the squadron was reassigned to the 2nd Air Division; to the Twenty-third Air Force on 1 February 1987; and to the 353rd Special Operations Wing (later the 353rd Special Operations Group), on 6 April 1989. The 1st SOS relocated to Kadena AB, Japan, on 5 February 1992.

In August 2000, a crew from the 1st SOS, along with another from the 17th SOS, flew a C-130 each to deliver 19 tons of disaster relief aid across the Pacific to assist in Vietnam's worst flooding in a century. Nearly 22,000 pounds of plastic sheeting, 3,600 blankets and 5,000 water containers were flown from Guam to Okinawa and then on to Vietnam by the two Kadena-based C-130s.

=== Post 2000 assignments ===
As an integral part of the 353rd Special Operations Group, the 1st Special Operations Squadron operated the MC-130H Combat Talon II until 2020. They currently operate the MC-130J Commando II aircraft in support of joint and allied special operations forces. This aircraft is capable of delivering troops and equipment into denied areas at night by airdrop or landing. Its aircrews are specially trained in night low-level flying, using night vision goggles. The 353rd Special Operations Group is the focal point for all U.S. Air Force special operations activities throughout the USPACOM theater. The group contains more than 1000 Airmen and six squadrons.

Throughout its history, the unit has been extremely active in humanitarian assistance and disaster relief. In 2005, the unit supported Operation UNIFIED ASSISTANCE, the relief effort from the 2004 Indian Ocean tsunami. In 2011, the unit supported Operation TOMODACHI, the relief effort from the Great East Japan earthquake and tsunami of 2011. In 2013, the unit supported Operation DAMAYAN, the relief effort from Super Typhoon Haiyan in the Republic of the Philippines.

== Lineage ==
1st Pursuit Squadron

- Constituted as the 1st Pursuit Squadron (Single Engine) and activated on 1 August 1939

Redesignated 1 Pursuit Squadron (Interceptor), on 6 December 1939
Disbanded on 1 May 1942

- Reconstituted and consolidated with the 1st Liaison Squadron and the 1st Special Operations Squadron as the 1st Special Operations Squadron on 19 September 1985

1st Liaison Squadron

- Constituted as the 1st Liaison Flight on 27 September 1949

Activated on 24 October 1949
Inactivated on 22 July 1952

- Redesignated 1st Liaison Squadron on 13 February 1953

Activated on 8 April 1953
Inactivated on 18 January 1954

- Consolidated with the 1 Pursuit Squadron and the 1st Special Operations Squadron as the 1st Special Operations Squadron on 19 September 1985

1st Special Operations Squadron

- Constituted as the 1st Air Commando Squadron, Composite and activated on 17 June 1963 (not organized)

Organized on 8 July 1963
Redesignated 1 Air Commando Squadron, Fighter, on 15 August 1967
Redesignated 1st Special Operations Squadron on 1 August 1968

- Consolidated with the 1 Pursuit Squadron and the 1st Liaison Squadron on 19 September 1985

=== Assignments ===
- 23d Composite Group (later Air Corps Proving Ground Detachment; Air Corps Proving Ground Group), 1 August 1939 – 1 May 1942
- Twelfth Air Force, 24 October 1949 (attached to 2602d Tow Target Squadron until 22 May 1950; 1st Tow Target Squadron after 27 May 1950)
- Fourteenth Air Force, 1 July 1950 (attached to 1st Tow Target Squadron)
- Tactical Air Command, 1 August 1950 (attached to 1st Tow Target Squadron)
- Ninth Air Force, 10 August 1951 – 22 July 1952 (attached to 1st Tow Target Squadron)
- Ninth Air Force, 8 April 1953 – 18 January 1954 (attached to 479th Fighter-Bomber Wing)
- Pacific Air Forces, 17 January 1963 (not organized)
- 34th Tactical Group, 8 July 1963
- 6251st Tactical Fighter Wing, 8 July 1965 (attached to 3d Tactical Fighter Wing after 21 November 1965)
- 2d Air Division, 18 February 1966 (attached to 3d Tactical Fighter Wing)
- 14th Air Commando Wing, 8 March 1966
- 56th Air Commando Wing (later 56th Special Operations Wing), 20 December 1967
- 18th Tactical Fighter Wing, 15 December 1972
- 18th Tactical Fighter Group, 1 May 1978
- 3d Tactical Fighter Wing, 15 January 1981
- 2d Air Division, 1 March 1983
- Twenty-Third Air Force, 1 February 1987
- 353d Special Operations Wing (later 353 Special Operations Group), 6 April 1989 – present

=== Stations ===
- Maxwell Field, Alabama, 1 August 1939
- Army Air Base, Orlando, Florida, c. 1 September 1940
- Eglin Field, Florida, 29 June 1941 – 1 May 1942
- Biggs Air Force Base, Texas, 24 October 1949 – 22 July 1952
- George Air Force Base, California, 8 April 1953 – 18 January 1954
- Bien Hoa Air Base, South Vietnam, 8 July 1963
- Pleiku Air Base, South Vietnam, 5 January 1966
- Nakhon Phanom Royal Thai Air Force Base, Thailand, 20 December 1967
- Kadena Air Base, Okinawa, 15 December 1972
- Clark Air Base, Philippines, 1 January 1981
- Kadena Air Base, Japan, 5 February 1992 – present

== Aircraft operated ==
- Curtiss P-36 Hawk (1939–1942)
- Curtiss YP-37 (1939–1940)
- Douglas O-38 (1940)
- Martin B-12 (1940)
- Lockheed C-40 Electra (1940)
- Curtiss P-40 Warhawk (1941–1942)
- Stinson L-13 (1949–1952)
- Beechcraft C-45 Expeditor (1952)
- de Havilland Canada L-20 Beaver (1952, 1953–1954)
- Sikorsky H-19 Chickasaw (1953–1954)
- North American T-28 Trojan (1963–1964)
- Helio U-10 Courier (1963–1966)
- Douglas C-47 Skytrain (1963–1966)
- Douglas B-26 Invader (1963–1964)
- Douglas RB-26 Invader (1963–1964)
- Douglas A-1 Skyraider (1964–1972)
- Douglas FC-47 (later AC-47 Spooky) (1964–1965)
- Lockheed MC-130 Combat Talon (1972 – 2020)
- Lockheed Martin MC-130J Commando II (2020–Present)
