= James C. Harding =

Retired US Air Force colonel and pilot (born 1934)

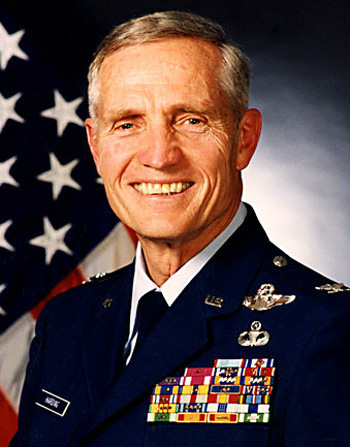
- Colonel James C. Harding
- Born: June 27, 1934 (age 92); Brookville, Pennsylvania, U.S.
- Military career
- Allegiance: United States
- Branch: United States Air Force
- Service years: 1956–1979
- Rank: Colonel
- Nickname: Jim
- Units: 313th Air Division; 1st Special Operations Squadron
- Commands: 1st Special Operations Squadron
- Conflicts: Vietnam War
- Awards: Air Force Cross; Silver Star (3); Legion of Merit (2); Distinguished Flying Cross (9); Bronze Star (2); Purple Heart (4); Meritorious Service Medal; Air Medal (40)
- Other work: Commander of Air Force Junior ROTC detachments Advisor to Royal Saudi Air Force

James C. Harding (born June 27, 1934) is a retired United States Air Force colonel and pilot. He served two tours, during the Vietnam War and flew a total 596 missions, all in propeller aircraft.

He served as squadron commander for a 400-person unit at Lackland Air Force Base and as an A-1 Skyraider combat squadron commander. Harding is one of the top 25 most decorated American veterans.

== Early life ==
Harding was born on June 27, 1934, in Brookville, Pennsylvania, one of five children into a dairy farming family.

He attended Pennsylvania State University studying for a Bachelor of Science in Agriculture. While at university he played lineman for the Penn State Nittany Lions football team. He turned down an offer to play for the Los Angeles Rams, as well as an opportunity to work International Harvester. On graduation he was commissioned, on June 9, 1956, through the Air Force Reserve Officer Training Corps program which he passed with distinction.

== Military career ==
Harding served as an instructor pilot and aerial demonstration pilot at Lackland Air Force Base, Texas, until September 1962. He flew with the 558th Tactical Fighter Squadron at MacDill Air Force Base, from September 1962 to July 1963, and then transferred to the 313th Air Division at Kadena Air Base in Okinawa.

=== Vietnam War ===
Harding flew 442 combat missions in the Cessna O-1 Bird Dog and U-10, of which 101 missions were over North Vietnam. He served as an Instructor with Squadron Officer School at Maxwell Air Force Base from 1967 to 1971, when he began training at Air Command and Staff College.

Harding returned to the U.S. in July 1967 and served as an Instructor with Squadron Officer School at Maxwell Air Force Base, until January 1971. Harding attended Air Command and Staff College from January to November 1971, and then returned to combat in Southeast Asia as the Commander of the 1st Special Operations Squadron at Nakhon Phanom Royal Thai Air Force Base in Thailand, where he flew another 154 combat missions in Douglas A-1 Skyraider.

=== 1972 mission to rescue Major Clyde D. Smith ===
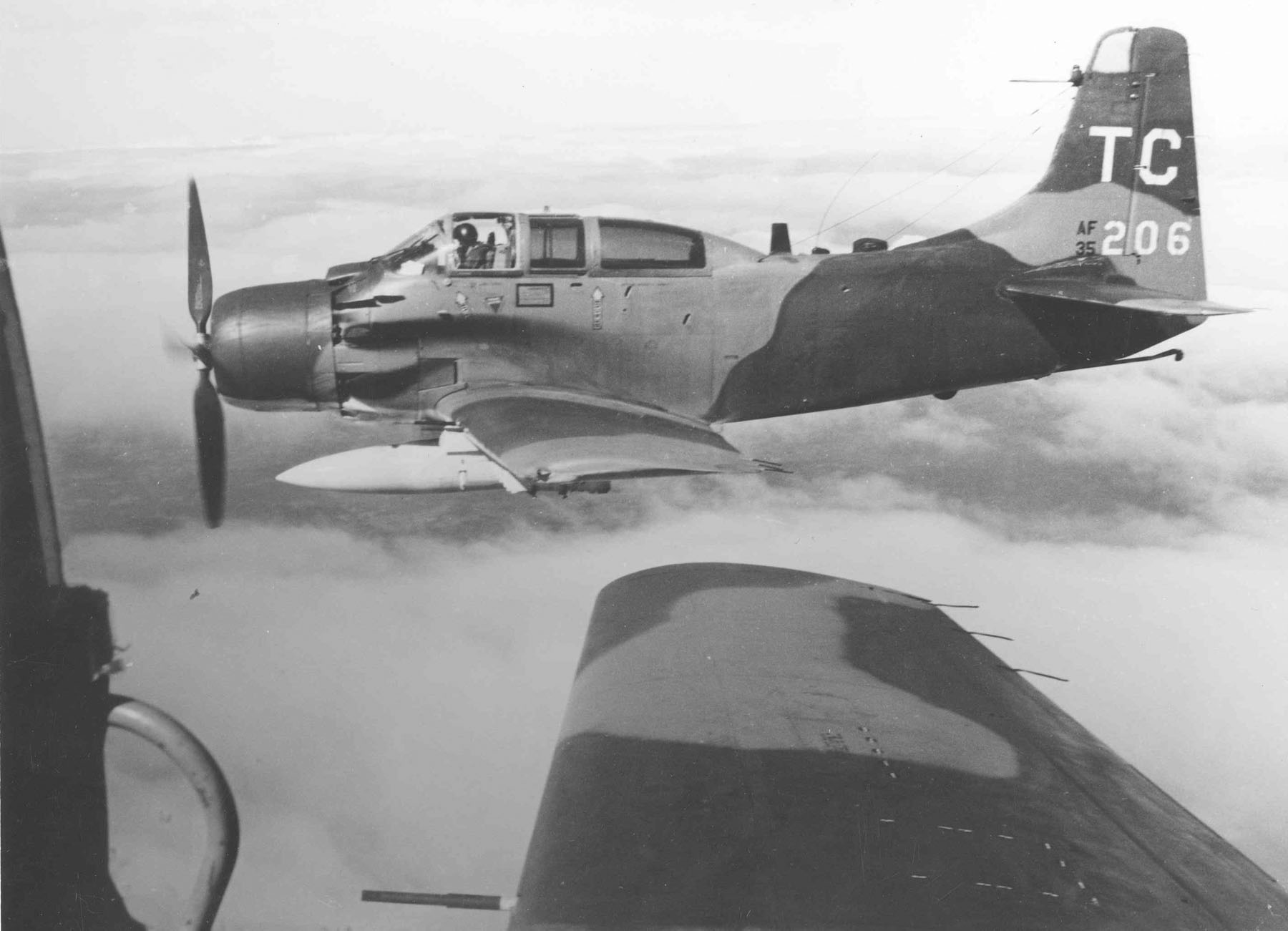
A-1E Skyraider of 1st SOS

In 1972, he was engaged in the rescue of U.S. Marine Corps A-6 Intruder pilot Major Clyde D. Smith and bombardier/navigator, 1st Lt. Scott D. Ketchie, who were shot down over North Vietnam. 1st Lt. Ketchie was not rescued and was subsequently declared Missing in action. For his effort in leading the rescue mission, Harding was awarded the Air Force Cross. The rescue effort is depicted in History Channel.

=== Shoot-down and evasion ===
He was shot down in Vietnam in 1972 northeast of Qui Nhơn and just south of the DMZ — an area overrun by the North Vietnamese Army.

After landing began clearing enemy foxholes. He killed three North Vietnamese soldiers, the first with his .38 pistol, the others with the dead soldier's SKS rifle. He successfully evaded capture by the North Vietnamese and was rescued by U.S. Army helicopters.

=== Post war ===
After Vietnam, Harding then served with the 23rd Tactical Fighter Wing at England Air Force Base, from November 1972 to November 1973, followed by service at Randolph Air Force Base, where he served until June 1976.

Harding then returned to Maxwell Air Force Base, where he served from July 1976 to September 1977. His final assignment was at Shaw Air Force Base, where he served from September 1977 until his retirement from the Air Force on July 31, 1979.

== Later life ==
After retiring from the Air Force, James served as Commander of several Air Force Junior ROTC detachments in Florida, Hawaii, Germany, Texas, and Italy.

He served as an honorary captain at the Penn State Nittany Lions vs. Rutgers Scarlet Knights football game on November 14, 2017.

== Awards and decorations ==
Harding is a Command pilot and Master parachutist in the USAF. He has over 8,000 flight hours and flown aircraft such as T-33, F-86 Sabre, F-84 Thunderjet, O-1 Bird Dog, U-10, A-1 Skyraider, and A-7 Corsair.

Air Force Command Pilot Badge
Air Force Master Parachutist Badge
Air Force Cross
Silver Star w/ 2 bronze oak leaf clusters	Legion of Merit w/ 1 bronze oak leaf cluster	Distinguished Flying Cross w/ 1 silver and 3 bronze oak leaf clusters
Bronze Star w/ Valor device and 1 bronze oak leaf cluster	Purple Heart w/ 3 bronze oak leaf clusters	Meritorious Service Medal
Air Medal w/ 4 silver oak leaf clusters	Air Medal w/ 3 silver and 1 bronze oak leaf clusters (second ribbon required for accouterment spacing)	Air Medal w/ 1 bronze oak leaf cluster (third ribbon required for accouterment spacing)
Air Force Commendation Medal w/ 1 bronze oak leaf cluster	Presidential Unit Citation w/ 2 bronze oak leaf clusters	Air Force Outstanding Unit Award w/ Valor device and 3 bronze oak leaf clusters
Combat Readiness Medal w/ 2 bronze oak leaf clusters	Air Force Recognition Ribbon	National Defense Service Medal
Armed Forces Expeditionary Medal	Vietnam Service Medal w/ 1 silver and 3 bronze campaign stars	Air Force Overseas Short Tour Service Ribbon
Air Force Overseas Long Tour Service Ribbon	Air Force Longevity Service Award w/ 4 bronze oak leaf clusters	Small Arms Expert Marksmanship Ribbon w/ 1 award star
Vietnam Gallantry Cross w/ Bronze Star	Vietnam Gallantry Cross Unit Citation	Vietnam Campaign Medal

- His other decoration include the Royal Thai Supreme Command Forward Badge (1st Class) of Thailand.
- Written descriptions of his medal awards can be read here: James Harding - Recipient
