= Brookville, Pennsylvania =

Borough in Pennsylvania, US

- Borough
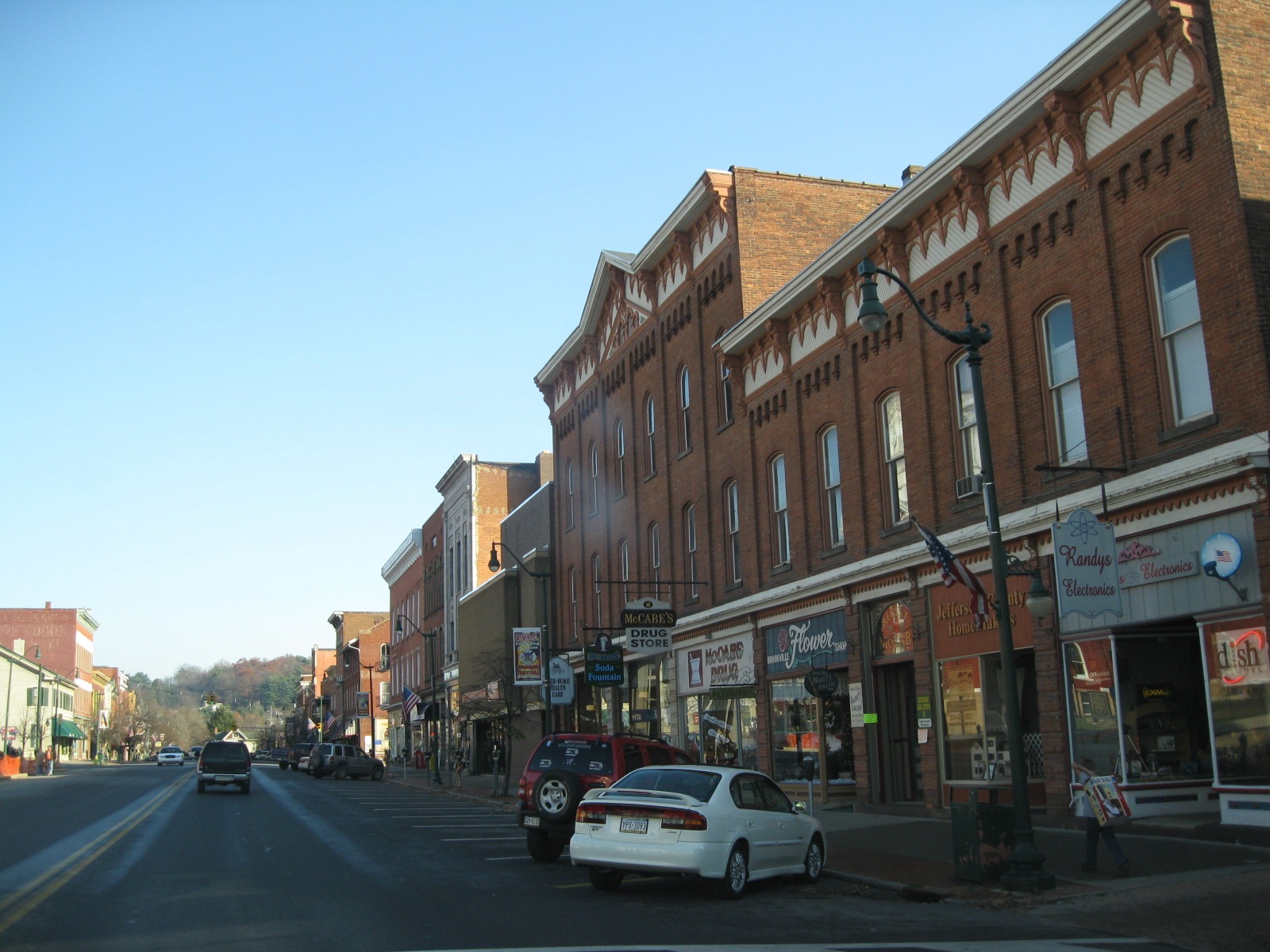
- Downtown Brookville, November 2009

- Logo

- Location of Brookville in Jefferson County, Pennsylvania

- Location within Pennsylvania Location within the United States
- Coordinates: 41°09′35″N 79°04′49″W
- Country: United States
- State: Pennsylvania
- County: Jefferson
- Settled: 1796
- Incorporated: 1830

Government
  - Type: Borough council
  - Mayor: Richard Beck

Area
  - Total: 3.24 sq mi (8.38 km^{2})
  - Land: 3.15 sq mi (8.15 km^{2})
  - Water: 0.089 sq mi (0.23 km^{2})
- Elevation: 1,273 ft (388 m)

Population (2020)
  - Total: 3,995
  - Density: 1,270.1/sq mi (490.37/km^{2})
- Time zone: UTC−5 (Eastern (EST))
  - Summer (DST): UTC−4 (EDT)
- ZIP Code: 15825
- Area code: 814
- FIPS code: 42-09224
- Website: borough.brookville.pa.us

Brookville is a borough in Jefferson County in the U.S. state of Pennsylvania, 70 miles (110 km) northeast of Pittsburgh. As of the 2020 census, Brookville had a population of 3,995. Founded in 1830, it is the county seat of Jefferson County.

== History ==
The area was initially settled in the late 1790s upon the arrival of brothers Joseph and Andrew Barnett, as well as their brother-in-law Samuel Scott, who together established the first settlement at the confluence of the Sandy Lick and Mill Creeks in the area now known as Port Barnett. The first non-Native American settler of the land within the eventual town limits was Moses Knapp, who built a log house at the confluence of North Fork Creek and Sandy Lick Creek (which form Redbank Creek) in 1801.

The 105th Pennsylvania Infantry Regiment, also known as the Wildcat Regiment, was a volunteer infantry regiment in the Union Army during the American Civil War.

== Geography ==
Brookville is located in west-central Jefferson County, bordered by Rose Township along its western half and Pine Creek Township along its eastern half.

The borough sits at the confluence of the North Fork and Sandy Lick Creeks, which together create the Redbank Creek, a west-flowing tributary of the Allegheny River.

Total area of the borough is 3.2 square miles (8.3 km^{2}), of which 3.1 sq mi (8.1 km^{2}) is land and 0.1 sq mi (0.2 km^{2}) is water.

U.S. Route 322 (Main Street) passes through the center of the borough.

== Demographics ==
Historical population
Census	Pop.	Note	%±
1850	763		—
1860	1,360		78.2%
1870	1,942		42.8%
1880	2,136		10.0%
1890	2,478		16.0%
1900	2,472		−0.2%
1910	3,003		21.5%
1920	3,272		9.0%
1930	4,387		34.1%
1940	4,397		0.2%
1950	4,274		−2.8%
1960	4,620		8.1%
1970	4,314		−6.6%
1980	4,568		5.9%
1990	4,184		−8.4%
2000	4,230		1.1%
2010	3,933		−7.0%
2020	3,995		1.6%

=== 2020 census ===
As of the 2020 census, Brookville had a population of 3,995. The median age was 43.9 years. 21.0% of residents were under the age of 18 and 25.1% of residents were 65 years of age or older. For every 100 females there were 87.3 males, and for every 100 females age 18 and over there were 83.1 males age 18 and over.

99.3% of residents lived in urban areas, while 0.7% lived in rural areas.

There were 1,834 households in Brookville, of which 24.3% had children under the age of 18 living in them. Of all households, 37.7% were married-couple households, 20.0% were households with a male householder and no spouse or partner present, and 34.3% were households with a female householder and no spouse or partner present. About 41.0% of all households were made up of individuals and 20.5% had someone living alone who was 65 years of age or older.

There were 2,031 housing units, of which 9.7% were vacant. The homeowner vacancy rate was 2.0% and the rental vacancy rate was 9.6%.

Racial composition as of the 2020 census
Race	Number	Percent
White	3,783	94.7%
Black or African American	8	0.2%
American Indian and Alaska Native	1	0.0%
Asian	31	0.8%
Native Hawaiian and Other Pacific Islander	2	0.1%
Some other race	24	0.6%
Two or more races	146	3.7%
Hispanic or Latino (of any race)	58	1.5%

=== 2000 census ===
As of the 2000 census, there were 4,230 people, 1,849 households, and 1,140 families residing in the borough. The population density was 1,312.6 inhabitants per square mile (506.8/km^{2}). There were 1,976 housing units at an average density of 613.2 per square mile (236.8/km^{2}). The racial makeup of the borough was 98.35% White, 0.26% African American, 0.09% Native American, 0.71% Asian, 0.09% from other races, and 0.50% from two or more races. Hispanic or Latino of any race were 0.47% of the population.

There were 1,849 households, out of which 28.0% had children under the age of 18 living with them, 47.0% were married couples living together, 11.5% had a female householder with no husband present, and 38.3% were non-families. 33.9% of all households were made up of individuals, and 18.3% had someone living alone who was 65 years of age or older. The average household size was 2.23 and the average family size was 2.85.

In the borough, the population was spread out, with 22.0% under the age of 18, 8.1% from 18 to 24, 26.1% from 25 to 44, 23.4% from 45 to 64, and 20.5% who were 65 years of age or older. The median age was 41 years. For every 100 females there were 83.8 males. For every 100 females age 18 and over, there were 81.2 males.

The median income for a household in the borough was $30,843, and the median income for a family was $38,438. Males had a median income of $29,940 versus $20,395 for females. The per capita income for the borough was $18,437. About 9.1% of families and 13.2% of the population were below the poverty line, including 25.1% of those under age 18 and 8.4% of those age 65 or over.

== Education ==
Brookville Area School District provides kindergarten through 12th grade public education including Brookville Area Jr./Sr. High School.

== Arts and culture ==
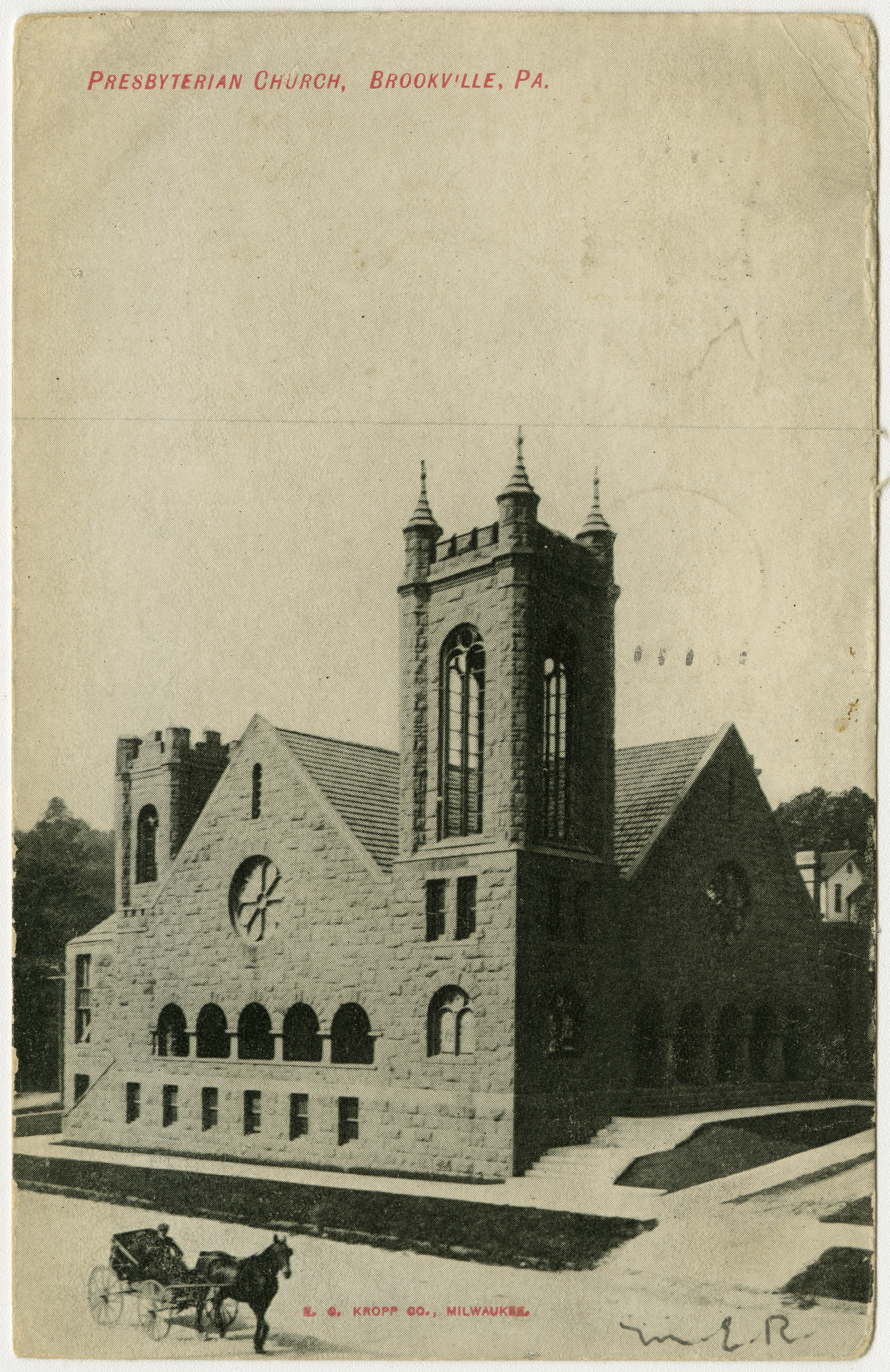
Brookville Presbyterian Church from a pre-1923 postcard

The Brookville Historic District, Brookville Presbyterian Church and Manse, Gray-Taylor House, Joseph E. Hall House, and Phillip Taylor House are listed on the National Register of Historic Places.

Brookville has hosted the annual Western Pennsylvania Laurel Festival in June since 1957.

== Notable people ==
- James G. Arner, judge
- Jack Arthurs, politician
- DeVeren Bookwalter, actor and director
- Carl C. Cable, engineer
- Thomas Canning, composer
- Mal Eason, baseball player
- James C. Harding, colonel
- Andy Hastings, American football player
- George A. Jenks, politician
- Bob Olderman, American football player
- Lewis Earle Sandt, pilot
- Bob Shawkey, baseball player
- Nathan Smith, golfer
- Albert C. Thompson, politician
