= Lewis Earle Sandt =

American aviation pioneer

Lewis Earle Sandt (May 19, 1888 – June 22, 1913) was an American aviation pioneer. Sandt was born in Brookville, Pennsylvania on May 19, 1888. Early in his life, he developed an interest in motorized machines, which led to his opening of a car garage named the Star Garage in Erie, Pennsylvania with his brother, Walter.

While in Erie, Earl (who used his middle name) was exposed to aviation exhibitions and had the opportunity to meet Lincoln Beachy, the renowned pioneer aviator. With advice from Beachy and others, he decided to learn to fly and attended the Curtiss Flying School in Hammondsport, New York.

Earl's career was highlighted by several flight records and a number of accidents. In Erie, Pennsylvania, He had his first accident in his new Curtiss aeroplane on the first day that he experimented with it. Without intending to fly, he lifted from the ground and crash landed, but avoided personal injury. On January 28, 1912, Sandt set an altitude record for Erie of 900 feet. Later, he bested his record by reaching an altitude of 7,800 feet. His most notable flight was his 34-minute flight across a frozen Lake Erie on February 15, 1912, to Long Point Peninsula near Port Rowan, Canada. Hailed as the first flight across inland seas in America and the first international flight from North America, this flight ended almost in tragedy, as Earl crash landed into the frozen Lake Erie on his return trip. He survived the crash and despite a number of injuries to his eye and body, hiked his way back to shore over and around ice hammocks and thin ice. Despite Sandt's offer of a $300.00 award for the retrieval of his aeroplane, search parties failed to find any remnants of the aeroplane.

With the help of Erie newspapers and friends, Sandt managed to acquire a new Curtiss Aeroplane in May 1912. On his first public flight, he flew from Walnut Creek, where he was testing his machine, to Waldameer and crashed into a pole to avoid hitting spectators. Earl's aeroplane was repaired and he resumed flying at his first exhibition outside of Erie in DuBois, Pennsylvania, reaching an altitude of 1800 feet.

Sandt's next flight was in Pittsburgh, Pennsylvania, where numerous aviators had limited success in previous exhibitions. On June 15, 1912, after taking off from Schenely Park in Oakland, Sandt had a successful flight in Pittsburgh lasting 21 minutes given thousands of spectators, many watching from rooftops, over the main parts of the city. After a couple of successful flights at Conneaut Exposition Park, Earl returned to his hometown of Brookville, Pennsylvania. Another mishap occurred when he attempted a flight with his cousin on board. Both survived with slight injuries. Later, Sandt, by himself, flew in what was reported as the first cross country flight in Western Pennsylvania from Brookville, Pennsylvania to Punxsutawney, Pennsylvania, a distance of 22 miles.

Returning to Conneaut Exposition Park, Sandt had several more fine exhibition flights until a bad crash resulted in several severe contusions and a concussion. After weeks of convalescing, Earl resumed flying at Fort Recovery, Ohio. Completing the engagement for another pilot, George Schmidt, Earl made the first air mail delivery for the state of Ohio. He then continued with flight exhibitions in Chrisney, Indiana, and Cortland New York. At Cortland, he was presented with a "Loving Cup" to award him for his aviation achievements. While in New York and flying from Moravia, he was shot at by a confused farmer. On September 2, 1912, Sandt returned to Pittsburgh, where he flew three days in exhibitions at Brunot's Island. He would finish the exhibition as the only successful flyer. His next flights took him to a number of small towns, Uricheville Ohio, Ripley West Virginia, and Clarion County. At Ripley, he ran his aeroplane into a wire fence, but escaped injury. While being filmed by the Columbia Educational Film Company he crashed into a barbed wire fence while flying at an exhibition in Lorain, Ohio, on October 6, 1912. Unhurt by his accident, Earl completed engagements at Greenville, Meadville, and Beaver Falls, Pennsylvania.

In the winter of 1913, Sandt embarked on a series of flights in Erie, Pennsylvania with passengers, including Nellie Seidel, 16 years old, who became the first female to fly in an aeroplane in Erie, Pennsylvania. In the spring of 1913, Earl made experimental trips at Lake Erie to test the hydroaeroplane built by Henry Seidel. This hydroaeroplane was the result of a collaboration between Earl, Seidel, and Earl's brother, Walter. Canceling the testing of the Hydroaeroplane in public during the Memorial Day weekend in 1913, Sandt instead flew in Belleville, Ontario for the King George V birthday celebration and fair, where he became the first to fly over the Bay of Quinte.

Sandt's last flight was in Grove City, Pennsylvania. After two trouble free flights, he was having another successful flight before hitting a downdraft which caused the aeroplane to drop suddenly and smash into a garage before landing on freshly cultivated ground. Earl sustained serious injuries, including a compound fracture to his left leg and a fracture to his left arm, as well as many contusions. Despite making good progress in healing from his injuries, Earl developed lock jaw, better known as tetanus. His brother Walter enlisted a special train to bring anti-toxin to Grove City. The anti-toxin brought improvement to Earl at first, but on June 22, 1913, Sandt's symptoms became grave and he died on June 22, 1913, and was buried in Brookville Pennsylvania.

In 1930, Mrs. Lindbergh, mother of Charles Lindbergh, who made the first solo flight across the Atlantic, stopped while in Brookville, Pennsylvania to pay tribute to Lewis Earle Sandt for his contributions to the development of early aviation. Other commendations included a "commemorative air mail envelope" designed for the first airmail service from Brookville to Pittsburgh. "In 1957, State Representative Ralph A. Marsh introduced a resolution to the Pennsylvania Assembly, paying tribute to Earle Sandt. It was done on the occasion of the 30th anniversary of the Charles Lindberg(h)'s flight from New York to Paris, and the 30th anniversary of the United States Air Force. On June 17, 1962, a special DuBois-to-Pittsburgh flight was named after Earle Sandt. Plaques were set up in memory of him at the Greater Pittsburgh International Airport and at the Dubois-Jefferson County Airport"

In 2001, Pulitzer Prize winning novelist Robert Olen Butler with the support of Florida State University participated in a series of livestreams in which he composed a short story in real-time. He selected a postcard capturing the moment before Sandt's death as the subject, which he later acknowledged as being unconsciously influenced by the then recent attack on the World Trade Center. In 2003, the story titled "This Is Earl Sandt" was published in The Georgia Review literary magazine.
