= Joseph E. Hall House (Brookville, Pennsylvania) =

Historic house in Pennsylvania, United States

- U.S. National Register of Historic Places
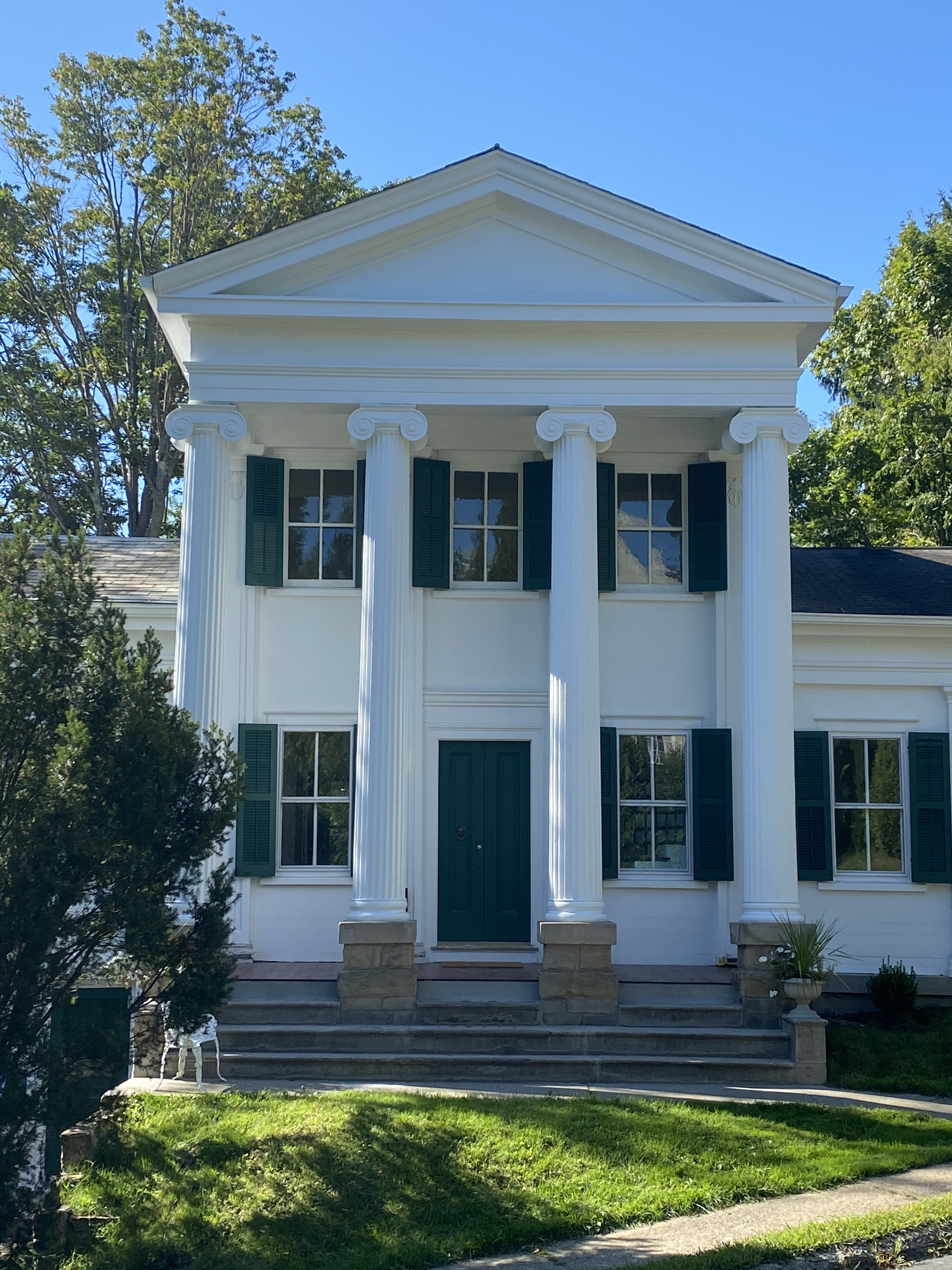

- Location within Pennsylvania Location within the United States
- Location: 419 Main Street, Brookville, Pennsylvania
- Coordinates: 41°9′39″N 79°5′5″W
- Area: less than one acre
- Built: c. 1848
- Architectural style: Greek Revival
- NRHP reference No.: 78002408
- Added to NRHP: December 13, 1978

The Joseph E. Hall House, also known as the Hall House, is an early historic home that is located on Main Street in Brookville, Jefferson County, Pennsylvania.

Located in the Brookville Historic District, it was added to the National Register of Historic Places in 1978.

== History and architectural features ==
Built circa 1848 by pioneer lumberman Joseph Hall, this structure is thought to be the oldest surviving residence in the town, and is considered one of the few superb examples of the Greek Revival "temple with wings" style to still exist in mid-western and north-central Pennsylvania. The facade features a two-story portico with four fluted Ionic order columns that were constructed of solid trees and a classical pediment (similar to the north facade of the White House).

After a century as a private residence, the house was deeded in 1956 as the Rebecca M. Arthurs Memorial Library, and then served as the town's public library until the late-1970s when it again became a residence.
