= Port Barnett, Pennsylvania =

Unincorporated community in Pennsylvania, U.S.

Coordinates: 41°09′23″N 79°03′03″W

Port Barnett is an unincorporated community in Jefferson County, in the U.S. state of Pennsylvania.

== History ==
The community was named for Joseph Barnett, the original owner of the town site.
