= United States Post Office (Punxsutawney, Pennsylvania) =

- United States Post Office-Punxsutawney
- U.S. National Register of Historic Places
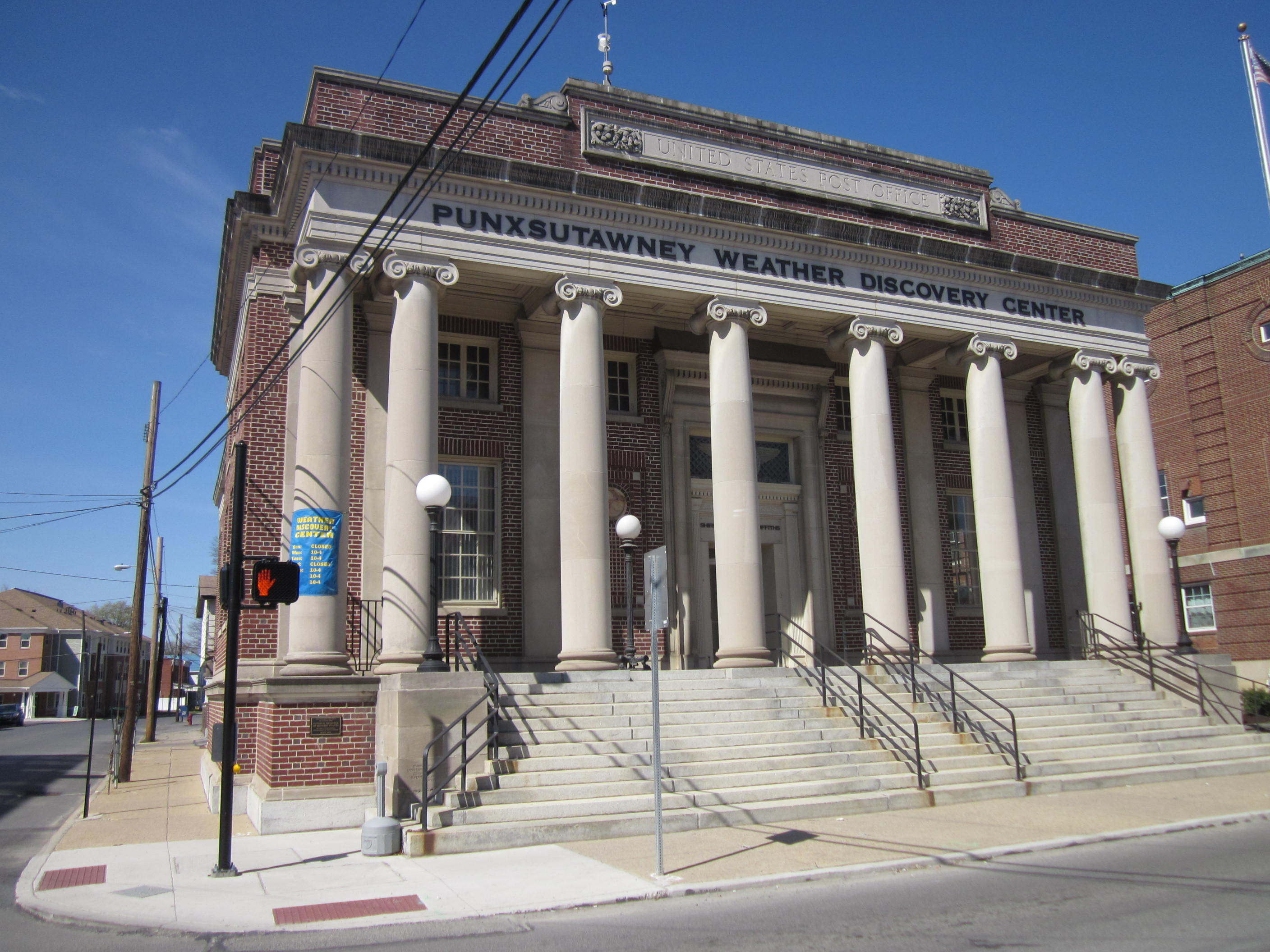
- Former U.S. Post Office, April 2012

- Location within Pennsylvania Location within the United States
- Location: 201 N. Findley St., Punxsutawney, Pennsylvania
- Coordinates: 40°56′41″N 78°58′20″W
- Area: less than one acre
- Built: 1914
- Built by: Henry, Edward
- Architect: Taylor, James Knox
- Architectural style: Classical Revival
- NRHP reference No.: 00001428
- Added to NRHP: November 22, 2000

The former United States Post Office in Punxsutawney is an historic post office building in Punxsutawney, Jefferson County, Pennsylvania, United States.

It was added to the National Register of Historic Places in 2000.

== History and architectural features ==
Designed by the Office of the Supervising Architect under James Knox Taylor, this historic structure was built between 1912 and 1914 and is a two-story brick building with a raised basement that was created in the Neo Classical Revival style. It features a full Ionic order, octastyle, limestone portico with a coffered ceiling and single-step parapet gable. It housed the post office until 1998.

The building now houses the Punxsutawney Weather Discovery Center.

The current post office, built 1998, is located at 553 E. Mahoning St.
