= Christian Miller House =

Historic house in Punxsutawney, Pennsylvania, US

- U.S. National Register of Historic Places
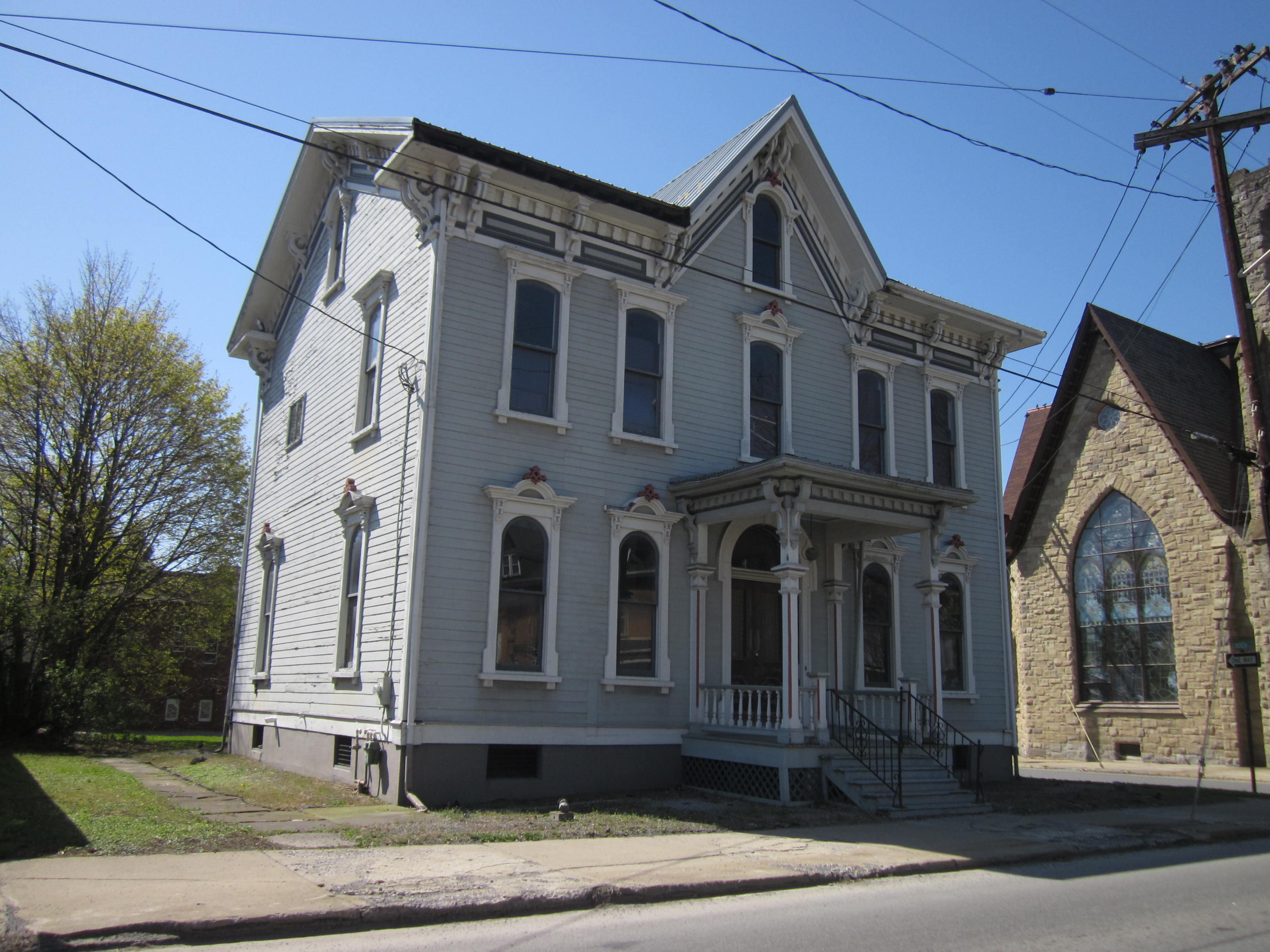
- Christian Miller House, April 2012

- Location within Pennsylvania Location within the United States
- Location: 233 W. Mahoning St., Punxsutawney, Pennsylvania
- Coordinates: 40°56′34″N 78°58′28″W
- Area: less than one acre
- Built: c. 1870
- Architectural style: Italianate
- NRHP reference No.: 94001565
- Added to NRHP: January 9, 1995

Christian Miller House is a historic home located at Punxsutawney, Jefferson County, Pennsylvania. It was built about 1870, and is a 2 1/2-story, frame dwelling on a stone foundation in the Italianate-style. It features a slate covered intersecting gable roof, hipped roof front porch, and round- and segmental-arched windows. For many years the house was divided into apartments.

It was added to the National Register of Historic Places in 1995.
