= Phillip Taylor House =

Historic house in Pennsylvania, United States

- U.S. National Register of Historic Places
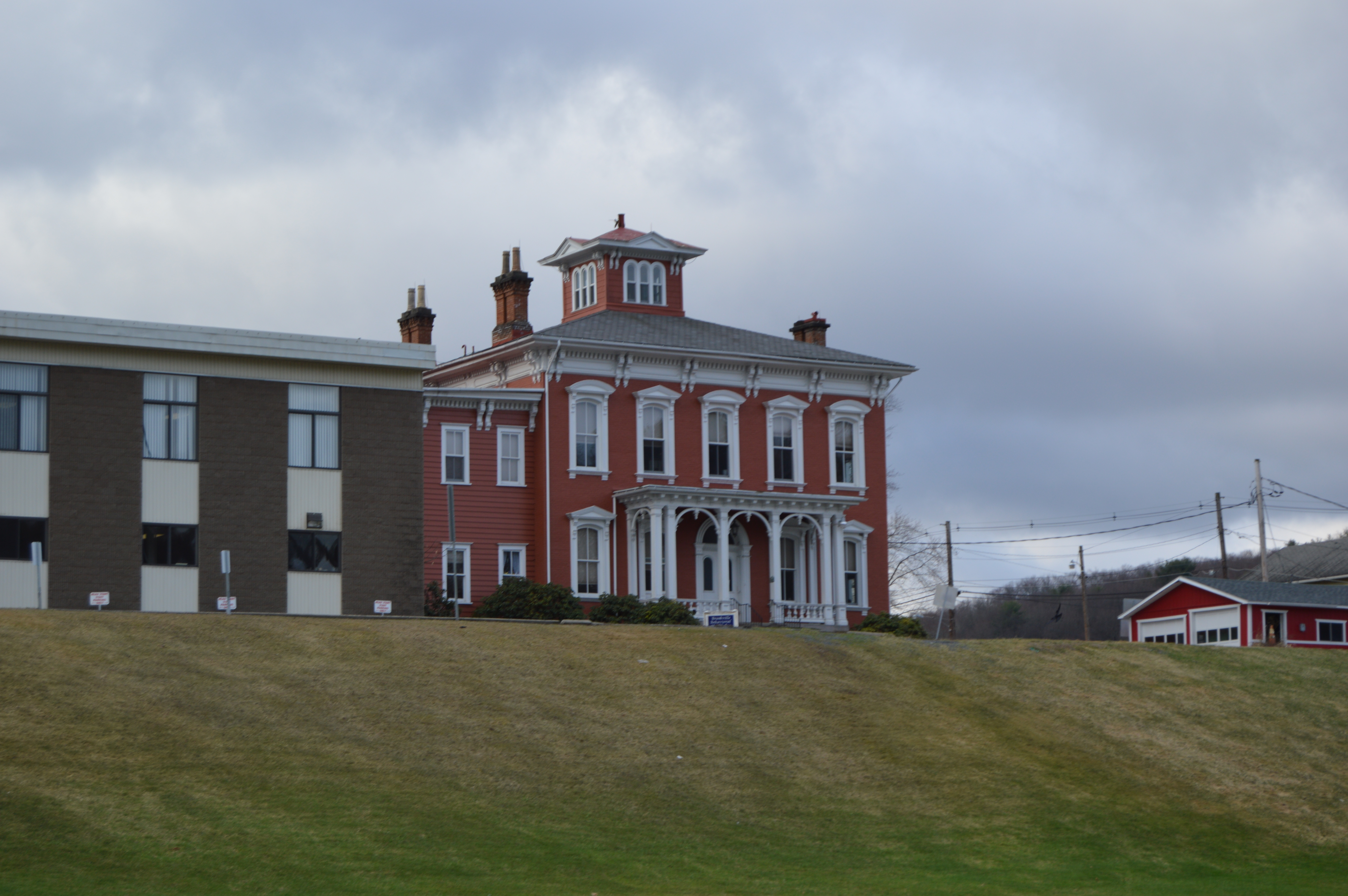
- View from the north

- Location within Pennsylvania Location within the United States
- Location: Euclid Ave., Brookville, Pennsylvania
- Coordinates: 41°9′3″N 79°4′49″W
- Area: 1.5 acres (0.61 ha)
- Built: c. 1841
- Architectural style: Italian Villa
- NRHP reference No.: 82003790
- Added to NRHP: July 22, 1982

The Phillip Taylor House, also known as the Pennsylvania Memorial Home, is an historic home that is located in Brookville, Jefferson County, Pennsylvania, United States.

It was added to the National Register of Historic Places in 1982.

== History and architectural features ==
Built circa 1841, this historic structure is a two-story, brick dwelling with a rear two-story addition and flanking wood-frame ell that was designed in the Italian Villa style. The main building has a hipped roof and belvedere. The front facade is five-bays wide and features an elaborately ornamented open porch. It was acquired for use as a soldier's convalescent home in 1889, and was used for that purpose into the 1970s.
