= James G. Arner =

American judge (born 1951)

- Born: 1951 (age 74–75); Brookville, Pennsylvania
- Occupations: Judge, attorney
- Known for: President Judge of Pennsylvania Courts of Common Pleas

The Hon. James G. Arner (born 1951 in Brookville, Pennsylvania) is the current two-term President Judge of the Pennsylvania Courts of Common Pleas of Clarion County, Pennsylvania of the 18th district.

Arner is a graduate of Temple University Beasley School of Law (1978), Grove City College (1973), and Colorado State University (1975). He was elected in 1999 and is a member of the Pennsylvania Conference of State Trial Judges, Ethics Committee/Legislative Committee, and the Domestic Violence Bench Book Committee. He was previously in private practice.
