= Gray-Taylor House =

Historic house in Pennsylvania, United States

- U.S. National Register of Historic Places
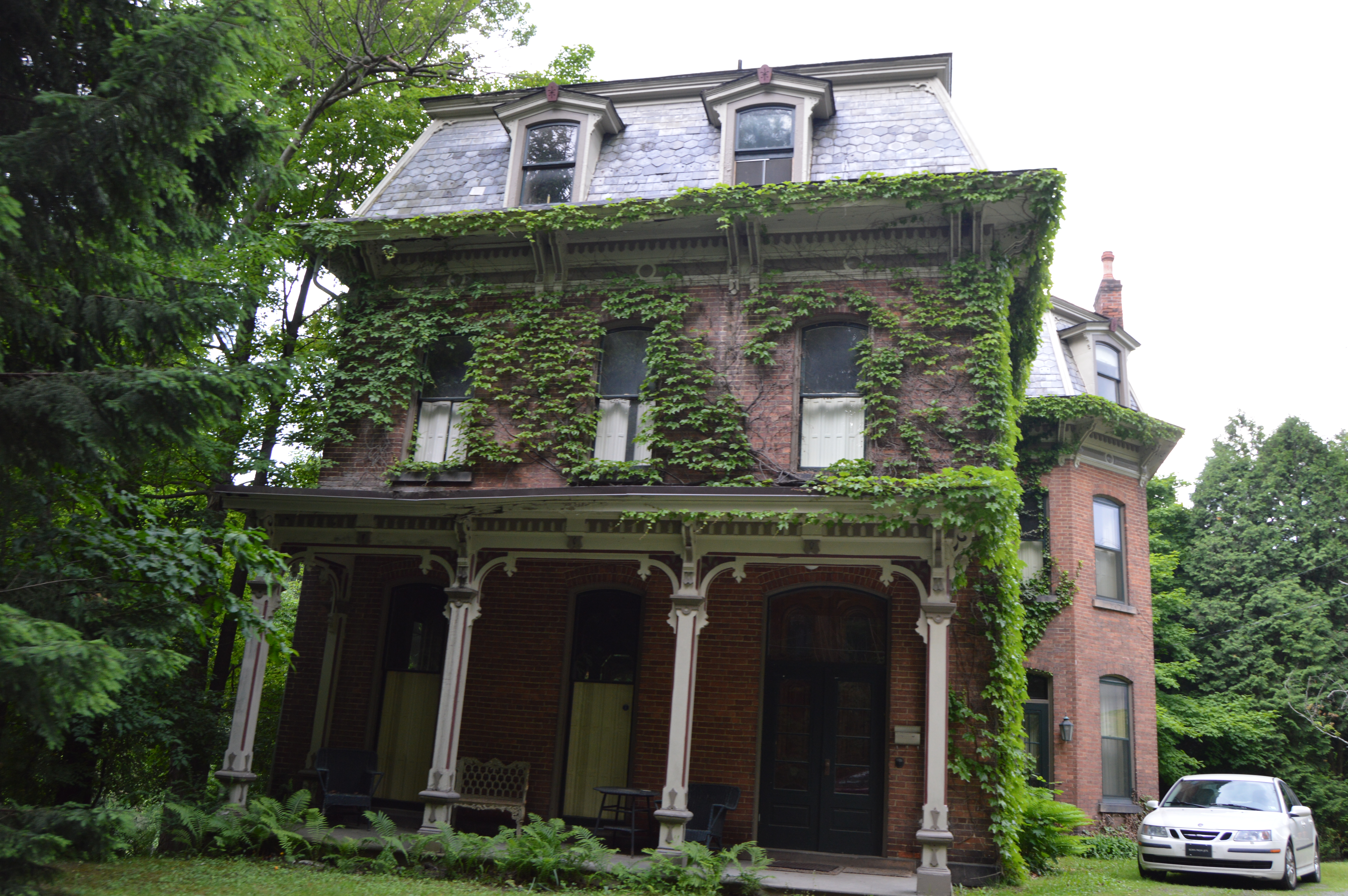
- Front of the house

- Location within Pennsylvania Location within the United States
- Location: 9 Walnut St., Brookville, Pennsylvania
- Coordinates: 41°9′46″N 79°5′1″W
- Area: Less than 1 acre (0.40 ha)
- Built: 1882
- Built by: Gray, William Henry
- Architectural style: Second Empire
- NRHP reference No.: 79002244
- Added to NRHP: August 3, 1979

The Gray-Taylor House is an historic home that is located in Brookville, Jefferson County, Pennsylvania, United States.

Located in the Brookville Historic District, it was added to the National Register of Historic Places in 1979.

== History and architectural features ==
Built in 1882, this historic structure is a three-story, brick dwelling with a two-story rear wing. Designed in the Second Empire style, it features a three-story projecting bay window, a mansard roof, and a one-story open porch across the front facade.
