= Brookville Presbyterian Church and Manse =

Historic church in Pennsylvania, United States

- U.S. National Register of Historic Places
- U.S. Historic district – Contributing property
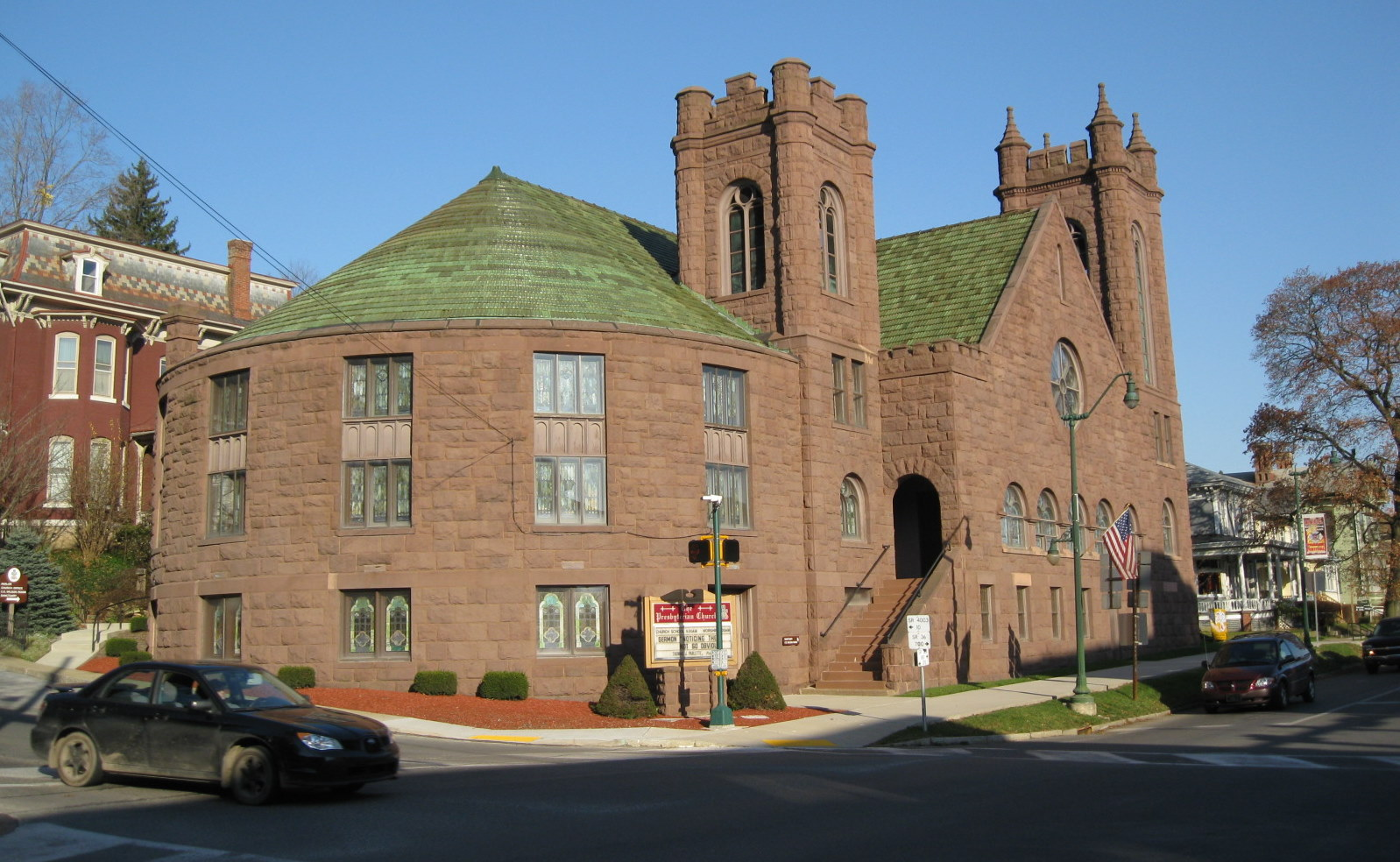
- Brookville Presbyterian Church, November 2009

- Location within Pennsylvania Location within the United States
- Location: White and Main Sts., Brookville, Pennsylvania
- Coordinates: 41°9′40″N 79°5′0″W
- Area: 0.6 acres (0.24 ha)
- Built: 1890, 1904-1905
- Architect: Robinson & Winkler; John H. Carr
- Architectural style: Second Empire, Romanesque
- NRHP reference No.: 82001538
- Added to NRHP: November 26, 1982

Brookville Presbyterian Church and Manse is a historic Presbyterian church located at White and Main Streets in Brookville, Jefferson County, Pennsylvania, United States. The church was built in 1904–1905, and is a Richardsonian Romanesque-style building built of Hummelstown brownstone. It features two entrances, each set in a loggia, and a square bell tower. The interior is designed in the Akron plan. The manse was built in 1890, and is a brick Second Empire-style dwelling. It features two, 2-story bay windows; a mansard roof; and an open porch.

It was added to the National Register of Historic Places in 1982. It is located in the Brookville Historic District.

== Gallery ==
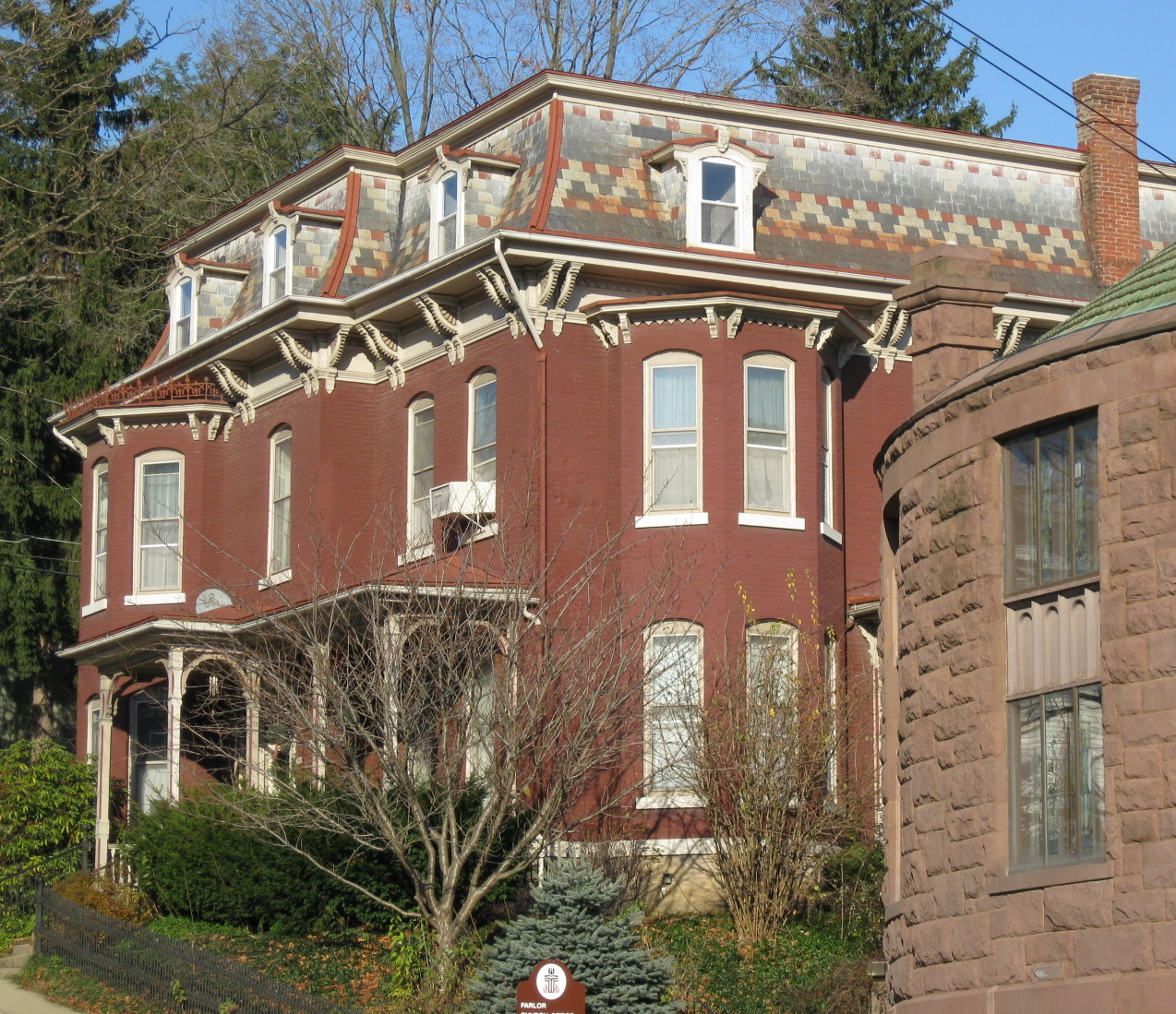
Brookville Presbyterian Church Manse, November 2009

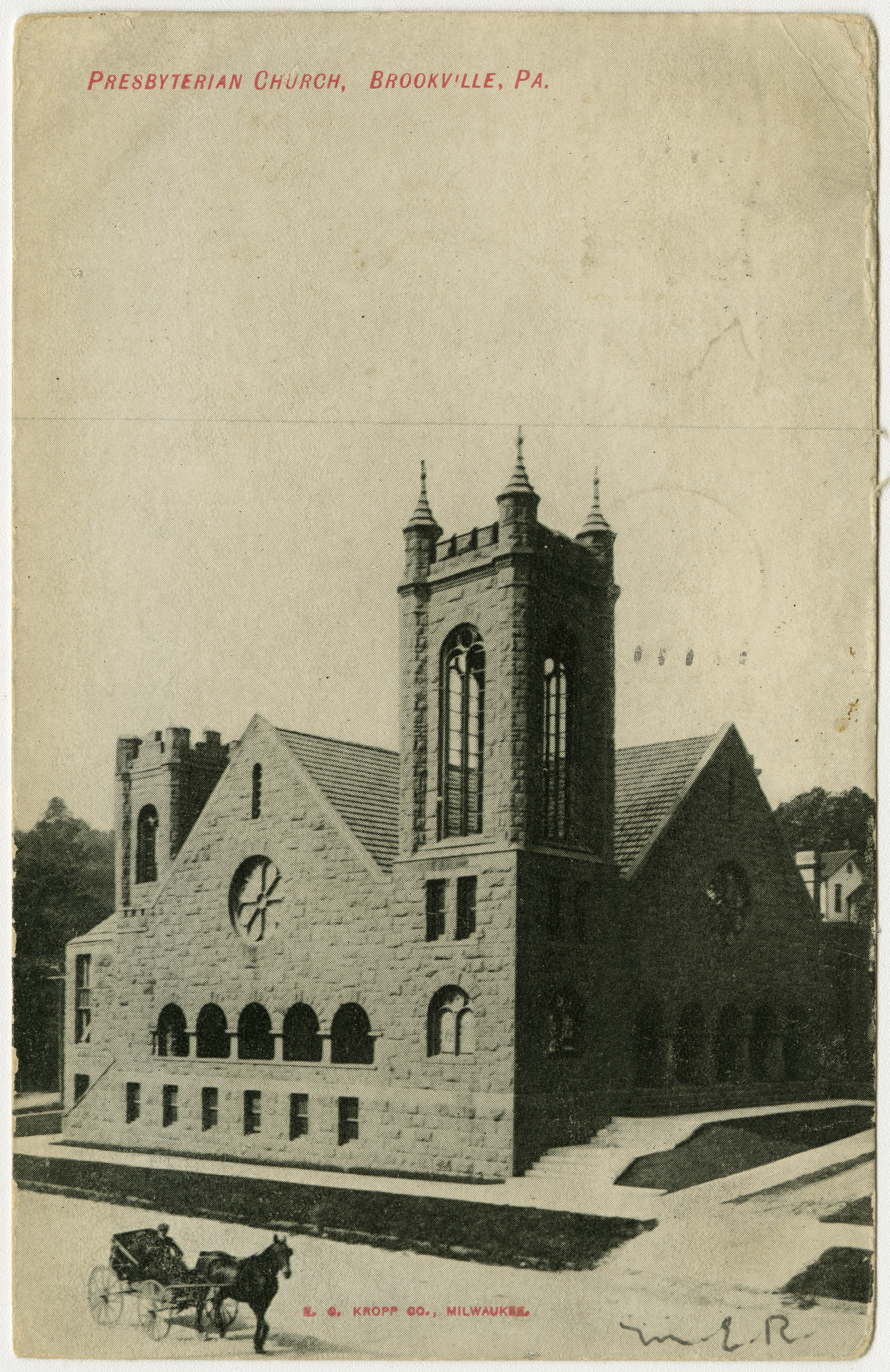
Church in a pre-1923 postcard
