= Giovanni Cobelli =

Giovanni (de) Cobelli (24 June 1849 – 22 January 1937) was an Italian civil servant and amateur naturalist.

After his studies in his home town of Rovereto, he went to Vienna to study natural history. On his return to his birthplace he taught at the technical institute, a position he occupied until 1902. He directed, from 1879 to 1937, the Rovereto museum. He collaborated with his brother Ruggero Cobelli (1838-1921), in various natural history researches, principally in entomology. He also worked with the entomologist Bernardino Halbherr (1844-1934).

== Sources ==
- Pietro Lorenzi & Silvio Bruno (2002). Uomini, storie, serpenti contributi alla storiografia erpetologica del Trentino-Alto Adige e Dintorni. Annali del Museo Civico di Rovereto, 17 : 173–274.
