= Punxsutawney, Pennsylvania =

Borough in the United States

Punxsutawney, Pennsylvania Punkwsutènay (Unami)
- Borough
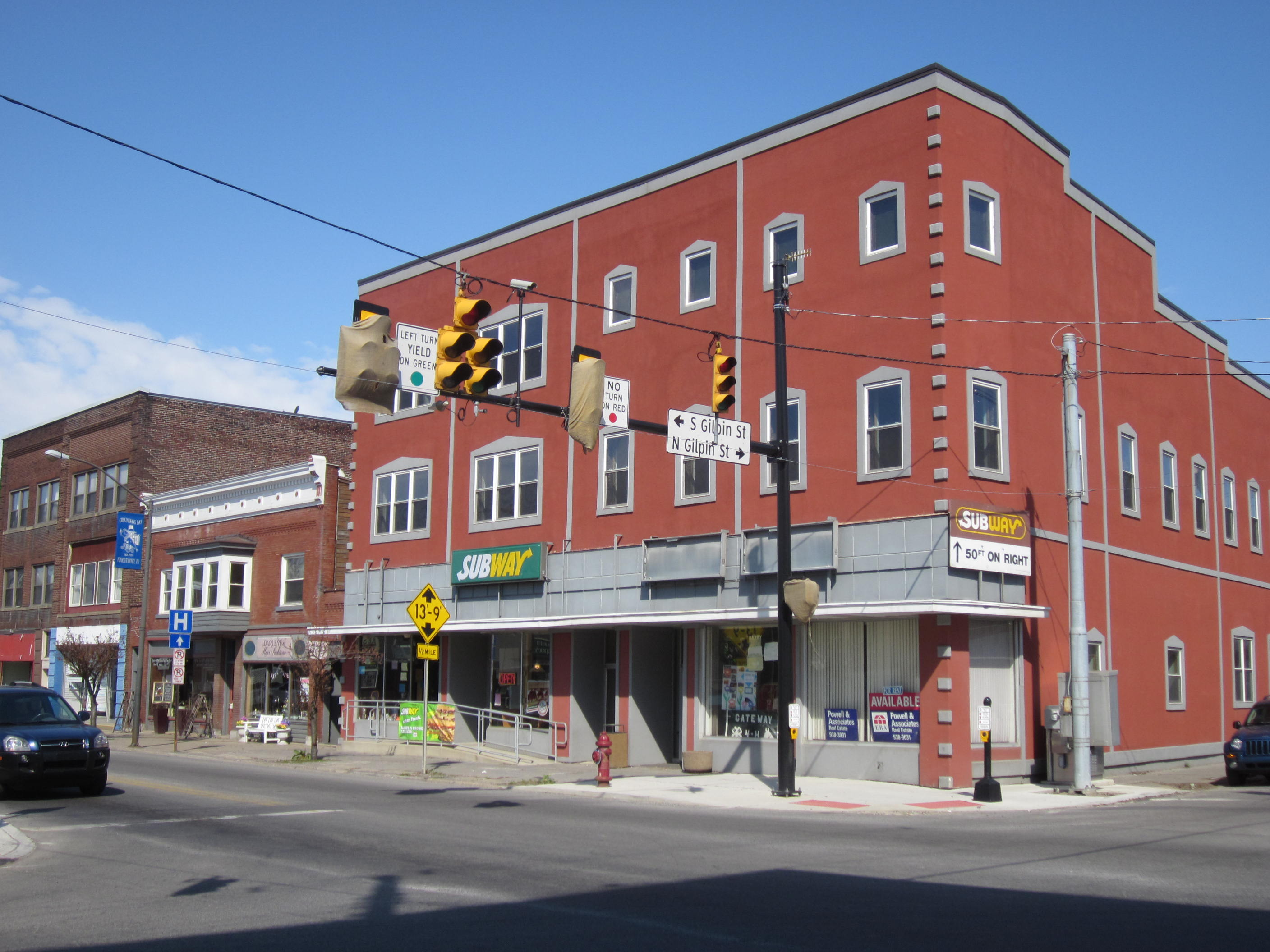
- Downtown Punxsutawney (2012)

- Seal
- Nicknames: "Weather Capital of the World," "Punxsy"
- Location within Jefferson County and Pennsylvania

- Location within Pennsylvania Location within the United States
- Coordinates: 40°56′44″N 78°58′31″W
- Country: United States
- State: Pennsylvania
- County: Jefferson
- Founded: 1816
- Incorporated: 1850

Government
  - Type: Borough Council
  - Mayor: Richard Alexander
  - Manager: Robert Santik

Area
  - Total: 3.43 sq mi (8.88 km^{2})
  - Land: 3.37 sq mi (8.72 km^{2})
  - Water: 0.066 sq mi (0.17 km^{2})
- Elevation: 1,230 ft (370 m)

Population (2020)
  - Total: 5,769
  - Density: 1,710/sq mi (662/km^{2})
- Time zone: UTC−5 (Eastern (EST))
  - Summer (DST): UTC−4 (EDT)
- ZIP Code: 15767
- Area code: 814
- FIPS code: 42-62920
- GNIS ID: 1214004
- Website: punxsutawneyboro.com

Punxsutawney (/ˌpʌŋksəˈtɔːni/; Lenape: Punkwsutènay) is a borough in southern Jefferson County, Pennsylvania, United States. As of the 2020 census, its population was 5,769. It is located approximately 84 miles (135 km) northeast of Pittsburgh. Punxsutawney is known for its annual Groundhog Day celebration held each February 2, during which thousands of attendees and media outlets visit the community for an annual weather "prediction" by the groundhog Punxsutawney Phil.

== History ==
Shawnee wigwam villages once occupied this site on the Mahoning Creek. The first settlement that included non-indigenous people was established in 1772, when Reverend John Ettwein, a Moravian Church missionary, arrived with a band of 241 christianized Lenape. Swarms of gnats plagued early settlers and their livestock for years, and are blamed for Ettwein's failure to establish a permanent settlement there. The clouds of biting gnats eventually drove the indigenous people away.

The indigenous people called the insects ponkies (living dust and ashes), and called their village Ponkis Utenink (land of the ponkies), from which the present name Punxsutawney evolved. One legend about the origin of the term ponkies concerned an old indigenous sorcerer-hermit who was said to have long terrorized indigenous people in the region. Eventually he was killed, his body burned, and his ashes were cast to the wind. According to the story, the ashes were transformed into minute living things that infested the swamp land. Another story about the source of the term asserted that the indigenous people compared the insect bites to burns caused by sparks or hot ashes.

The area was originally settled by the Lenape Indian tribe, and a more definitive source says the name Punxsutawney derives from a Native name in the Lenape language, Unami: Punkwsutènay, which translates to "town of the sandflies" or "town of the mosquitoes" (punkwës- 'mosquito' + -utènay 'town'). Alternatively, the name is said to come from another Unami term, Put'schisk'tey, which means "poison vine." The Shawnee and Delaware left Pennsylvania and had settled in Ohio by the end of the American Revolution.

The Pennsylvania Department of Transportation (PennDOT) Keystone Marker lists that Punxsutawney was founded in 1818. In 1840 it was reported that Punxsutawney was a village of about 15 or 20 dwellings. Settlers drawn by lumbering and coal mining eventually drained the swamps and exterminated the insects. The Borough of Punxsutawney was incorporated in 1850, and had a population of 256 at that time.

In 1907, the Punxsutawney and Claysville boroughs were consolidated and incorporated as Greater Punxsutawney, resulting in a combined population of 9,058 in 1910. A high-grade bituminous soft coal was mined in the surrounding region. Shortly after 1850, mining was being supplanted by factories which included brickworks, glassworks, tanneries, foundries, ironworks, machine shops, and wood planing, flour, feed, and silk mills. By the 1930s these were mostly gone, and townspeople were dependent largely on the Baltimore & Ohio Railroad repair shops north of town, and a meat packing plant, in addition to the remaining coal mining and batteries of beehive coke ovens.

In 1900, 6,746 people lived in Punxsutawney before the consolidation with Claysville. After consolidation, the population in 1910 was 9,058; in 1920, 10,311; in 1930, 9,266; prewar in 1940, 9,482; and postwar in 1950, 8,969 people lived there. The population was 5,962 at the 2010 census.

A groundhog known as Punxsutawney Phil is kept in nearby Young Township, and is said to predict the weather annually on Groundhog Day, February 2. The event provided the premise for the 1993 film Groundhog Day, although nearly all of the film was shot in Woodstock, Illinois.

The T. M. Kurtz House, Jefferson Theater, Christian Miller House, and United States Post Office-Punxsutawney are listed on the National Register of Historic Places.

== Geography ==
Punxsutawney is located at 40°56′44″N 78°58′31″W (40.945454, -78.975175), roughly 80 miles (130 km) northeast of Pittsburgh and 150 miles (240 km) southeast of Erie. According to the U.S. Census Bureau, the borough has a total area of 3.4 square miles (8.8 km^{2}). One small river, Mahoning Creek, winds through the town. It is bordered on the north, west, and south by Young Township, and on the east by Bell Township.

Climate data for Punxsutawney, Pennsylvania
Month	Jan	Feb	Mar	Apr	May	Jun	Jul	Aug	Sep	Oct	Nov	Dec	Year
Record high °F (°C)	70 (21)	71 (22)	79 (26)	89 (32)	92 (33)	99 (37)	101 (38)	100 (38)	99 (37)	90 (32)	81 (27)	64 (18)	101 (38)
Mean daily maximum °F (°C)	33.1 (0.6)	36.7 (2.6)	45.9 (7.7)	59.6 (15.3)	69.2 (20.7)	77.3 (25.2)	80.7 (27.1)	79.6 (26.4)	72.2 (22.3)	60.8 (16.0)	49.1 (9.5)	36.9 (2.7)	58.4 (14.7)
Mean daily minimum °F (°C)	16.2 (−8.8)	17.8 (−7.9)	24.1 (−4.4)	34.0 (1.1)	43.8 (6.6)	52.7 (11.5)	57.1 (13.9)	55.7 (13.2)	48.4 (9.1)	37.5 (3.1)	30.5 (−0.8)	21.4 (−5.9)	36.6 (2.6)
Record low °F (°C)	−27 (−33)	−23 (−31)	−15 (−26)	11 (−12)	22 (−6)	28 (−2)	31 (−1)	31 (−1)	18 (−8)	14 (−10)	0 (−18)	−26 (−32)	−27 (−33)
Average precipitation inches (mm)	3.18 (81)	2.79 (71)	3.70 (94)	3.63 (92)	4.13 (105)	5.03 (128)	4.58 (116)	4.10 (104)	4.14 (105)	3.05 (77)	3.65 (93)	3.44 (87)	45.42 (1,154)
Average snowfall inches (cm)	14.2 (36)	9.9 (25)	9.6 (24)	1.9 (4.8)	0 (0)	0 (0)	0 (0)	0 (0)	0 (0)	0.1 (0.25)	2.4 (6.1)	11.3 (29)	49.4 (125)

== Demographics ==
Historical population
Census	Pop.	Note	%±
1850	256		—
1860	415		62.1%
1870	553		33.3%
1880	674		21.9%
1890	2,792		314.2%
1900	4,375		56.7%
1910	9,058		107.0%
1920	10,311		13.8%
1930	9,266		−10.1%
1940	9,482		2.3%
1950	8,969		−5.4%
1960	8,805		−1.8%
1970	7,792		−11.5%
1980	7,479		−4.0%
1990	6,782		−9.3%
2000	6,271		−7.5%
2010	5,962		−4.9%
2020	5,769		−3.2%

In the 2010 census, there were 5,962 people, 2,573 households and 1,602 families in the borough. The population density was 1,836.2 inhabitants per square mile (709.0/km^{2}). There were 3,042 housing units at an average density of 890.7 per square mile (343.9/km^{2}). The racial makeup of the borough was 98.8% White, 0.2% African American, 0.2% Native American, 0.3% Asian, <0.1% from other races, and 0.5% from two or more races. Hispanic or Latino of any race were 0.8% of the population.

There were 2,749 households, out of which 25.3% had children under the age of 18 living with them, 41.0% were married couples living together, 13.5% had a female householder with no husband present, and 41.7% were non-families. 37.8% of all households were made up of individuals, and 20.6% had someone living alone who was 65 years of age or older. The average household size was 2.19 and the average family size was 2.89.

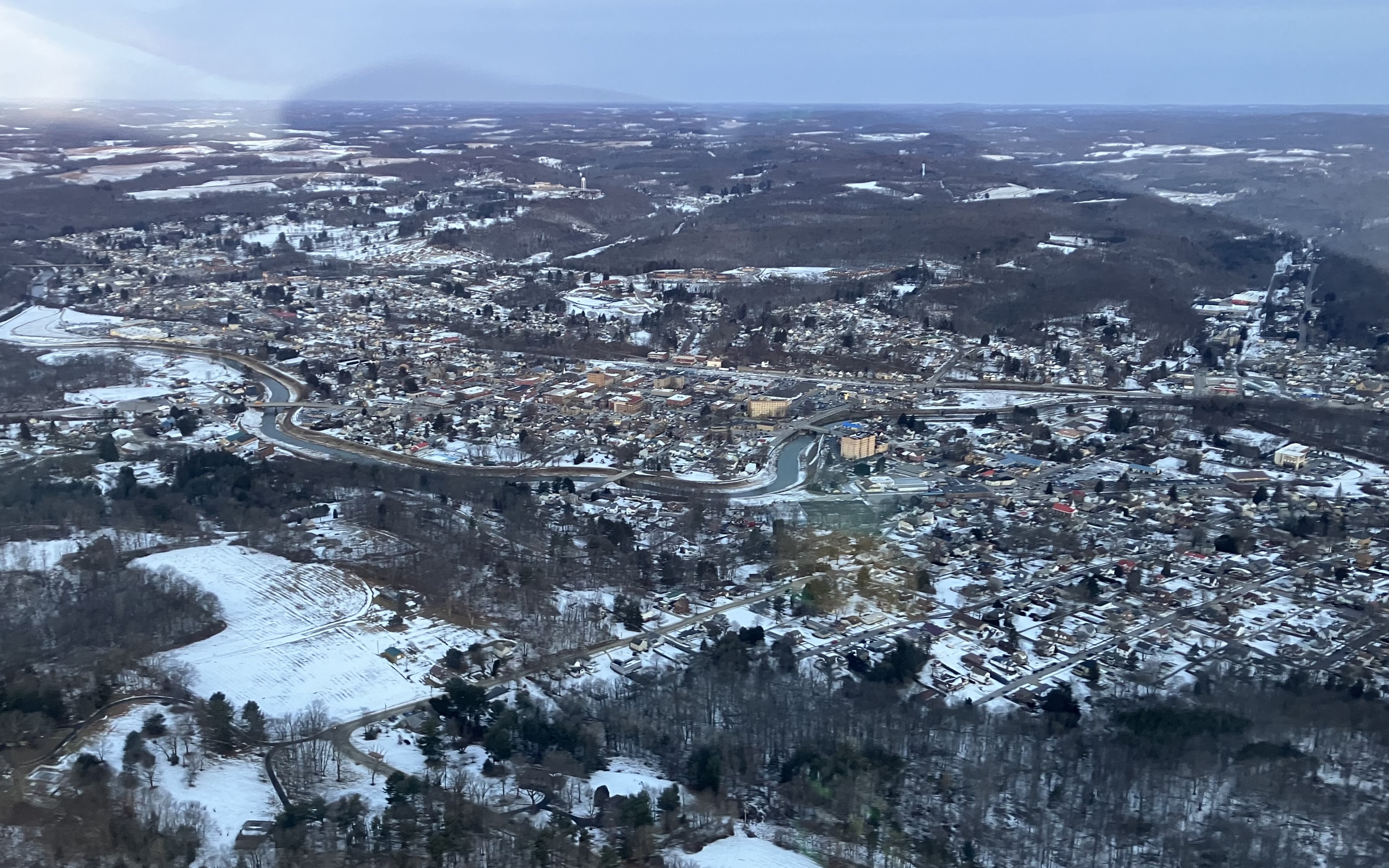
Punxsutawney from the air

In the borough, the population was spread out, with 21.3% under the age of 18, 9.9% from 18 to 24, 25.1% from 25 to 44, 21.6% from 45 to 64, and 22.2% who were 65 years of age or older. The median age was 41 years. For every 100 females there were 80.9 males. For every 100 females age 18 and over, there were 77.2 males.

The median income for a household in the borough was $26,250, and the median income for a family was $33,054. Men had a median income of $28,958 versus $19,076 for women. The per capita income for the borough was $14,802. About 13.3% of families and 16.9% of the population were below the poverty line, including 20.6% of those under age 18 and 12.8% of those age 65 or over.

== Government ==
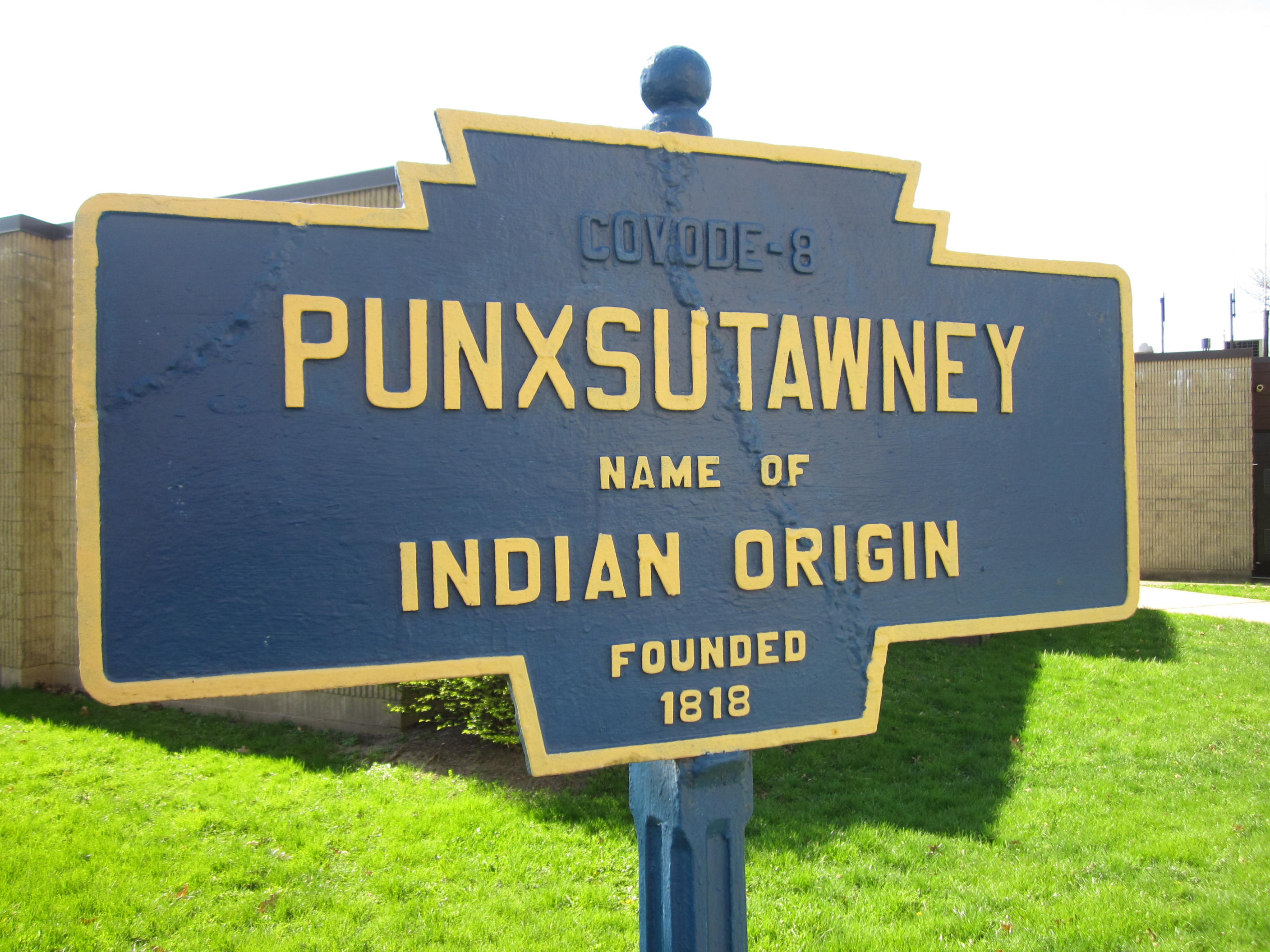
Keystone Marker (2012)

Punxsutawney is governed by seven council members, each elected to a four-year term. The mayor, Richard Alexander, is elected to a four-year term, and in addition to other duties, has oversight of its police department. Other elected offices include one tax collector (four-year term) and six constables (four-year terms).

The borough manager position, held by Robert Santik, is the borough's chief administrative officer and reports to borough council.

Punxsutawney is the most populous incorporated municipality in Jefferson County.

== Education ==
The Punxsutawney Area School District serves the borough of Punxsutawney and the surrounding area for K-12 education. After consolidating six elementary schools as of the 2018-2019 school year, the district now operates two schools. The Punxsutawney Area Elementary School is a K-6 building. The Punxsutawney Area High School serves students in grades 7-12. Students may also attend Jefferson County-DuBois Area Vocational Technical School in nearby Reynoldsville, Pennsylvania.

Punxsutawney Christian School and SS. Cosmas & Damian School (SSCD) are two private schools in Punxsutawney.

The Indiana University of Pennsylvania (IUP) maintains a satellite branch in Punxsutawney, including a respected culinary school.

== Emergency services ==
The Borough of Punxsutawney employs a full-time police service made up of 12 police officers. Dispatchers and wardens are employed by the borough and work closely with police. The police station is staffed 24 hours a day, 7 days a week, by both police officers and wardens.

The Punxsutawney Fire Department is made up of three volunteer stations, The Central Fire Dept. (Jefferson County Station 20), Elk Run Volunteer Fire Company (Jefferson County Station 30), and Lindsey Fire Company (Jefferson County Station 40). The president of the Punxsutawney Fire Department is Tami McFarland. The Fire Department Chief is Brian Smith.

In addition to department officers, each station elects its own officers. Scott Depp is the chief of Central Fire Dept., Doug McAfoos the chief of Elk Run VFC, and Joe DeFelice Jr. the chief of Lindsey Fire Co. The fire department responds to fires, vehicle accidents, hazardous materials incidents, and rescue situations in the borough of Punxsutawney, Bell Township, and Young Township. The Punxsutawney Fire Department maintains an active water rescue team comprising scuba divers and a boat crew.

Jefferson County EMS operates the ambulance station in Punxsutawney. Station 50 is a full advanced life support service comprising paramedics and emergency medical technicians. Station 50 serves not only the borough of Punxsutawney, but also southern Jefferson County and parts of northern Indiana County.

== Media ==
- Receives television programming from the Johnstown–Altoona media market.
- WECZ-AM - news/talk
- WPXZ-FM - adult contemporary, sports
- Punxsutawney Hometown magazine, since 1999, is locally owned.
- The Punxsutawney Spirit, Jefferson County's only daily newspaper, owned by Illinois-based Horizon Publications Inc.
  - Mahoning Valley Spirit (Punxsutawney, Pa.) 1873-1876
  - The Punxsutawney Spirit (Punxsutawney, Pa.) 1876-1911
  - The Punxsutawney Spirit (Punxsutawney, Pa.) 1906-1967
  - The Spirit (Punxsutawney, Pa.) 1967-Current

== Notable people ==
- Punxsutawney Phil (b. 1887), the central figure in Punxsutawney's annual Groundhog Day celebration.
- Britt Baker (b. 1991), professional wrestler with All Elite Wrestling
- Chuck Daly (1930–2009), former Basketball Hall of Fame head coach for Detroit Pistons and head coach of the gold medal winning "Dream Team" in the 1992 Summer Olympics
- Wilbur Good (1885–1963), former professional baseball player, Philadelphia Phillies
- Bill Hunter (b. 1928-2025) retired American shortstop, coach and manager in Major League Baseball
- Lloyd Jordan (1900–1990), former head coach at Harvard and College Football Hall of Fame inductee
- Devin Mesoraco (b. 1988) is a baseball coach and former professional baseball catcher, who is the current catching coach for the Pittsburgh Panthers NCAA Division I intercollegiate baseball program
- John Mizerock (b. 1960), former professional baseball player, Atlanta Braves and Houston Astros

== See also ==
- Groundhog Day - 1993 film set in Punxsutawney.
- Groundhog Day Musical - 2017 musical based on the film.
