= Jefferson Theater (Punxsutawney, Pennsylvania) =

- U.S. National Register of Historic Places
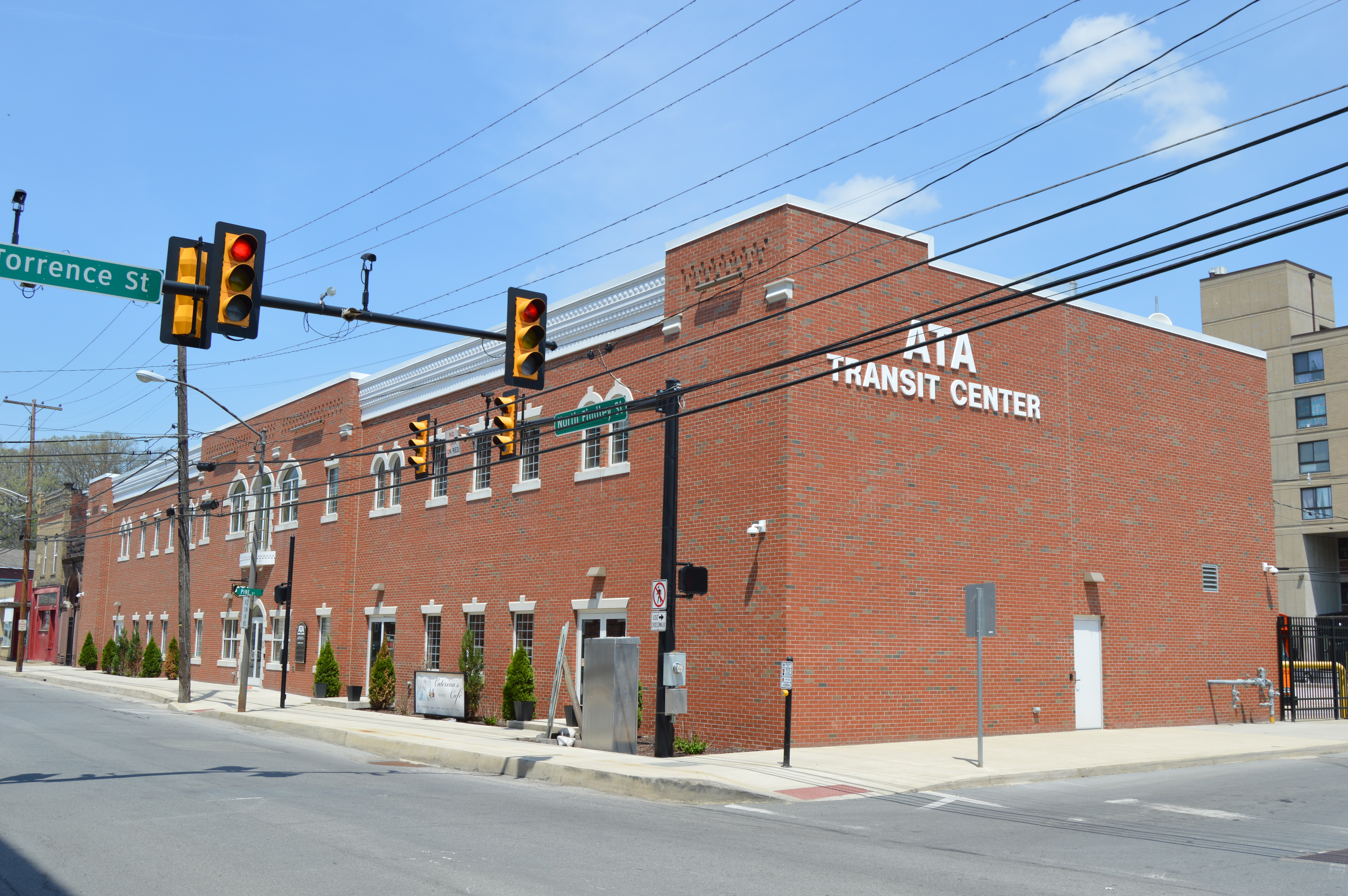
- Site of the theater, now a bus station

- Location within Pennsylvania Location within the United States
- Location: 230 N. Findley St., Punxsutawney, Pennsylvania
- Coordinates: 40°56′39″N 78°58′30″W
- Area: less than one acre
- Built: 1905
- Built by: Harl, McKean
- Architect: Parks, H.C.
- NRHP reference No.: 85001001
- Added to NRHP: May 9, 1985

The Jefferson Theater was an historic theatre building that was located in Punxsutawney, Jefferson County, Pennsylvania.

Punxsutawney's only remaining theater, it closed in 1978. Added to the National Register of Historic Places in 1985, it was demolished in 1998.

== History and architectural features ==
Built circa 1905, this historic structure consisted of a lobby section that was connected to the auditorium. The lobby measured approximately seventy feet long by twelve feet wide, and was attached to the approximately seventy-foot by one hundred and seven-foot auditorium, which had a balcony and seating for more than 1,200 patrons. It closed in 1978 and was Punxsutawney's only remaining theater.
