= T. M. Kurtz House =

Historic house in Pennsylvania, United States

- U.S. National Register of Historic Places
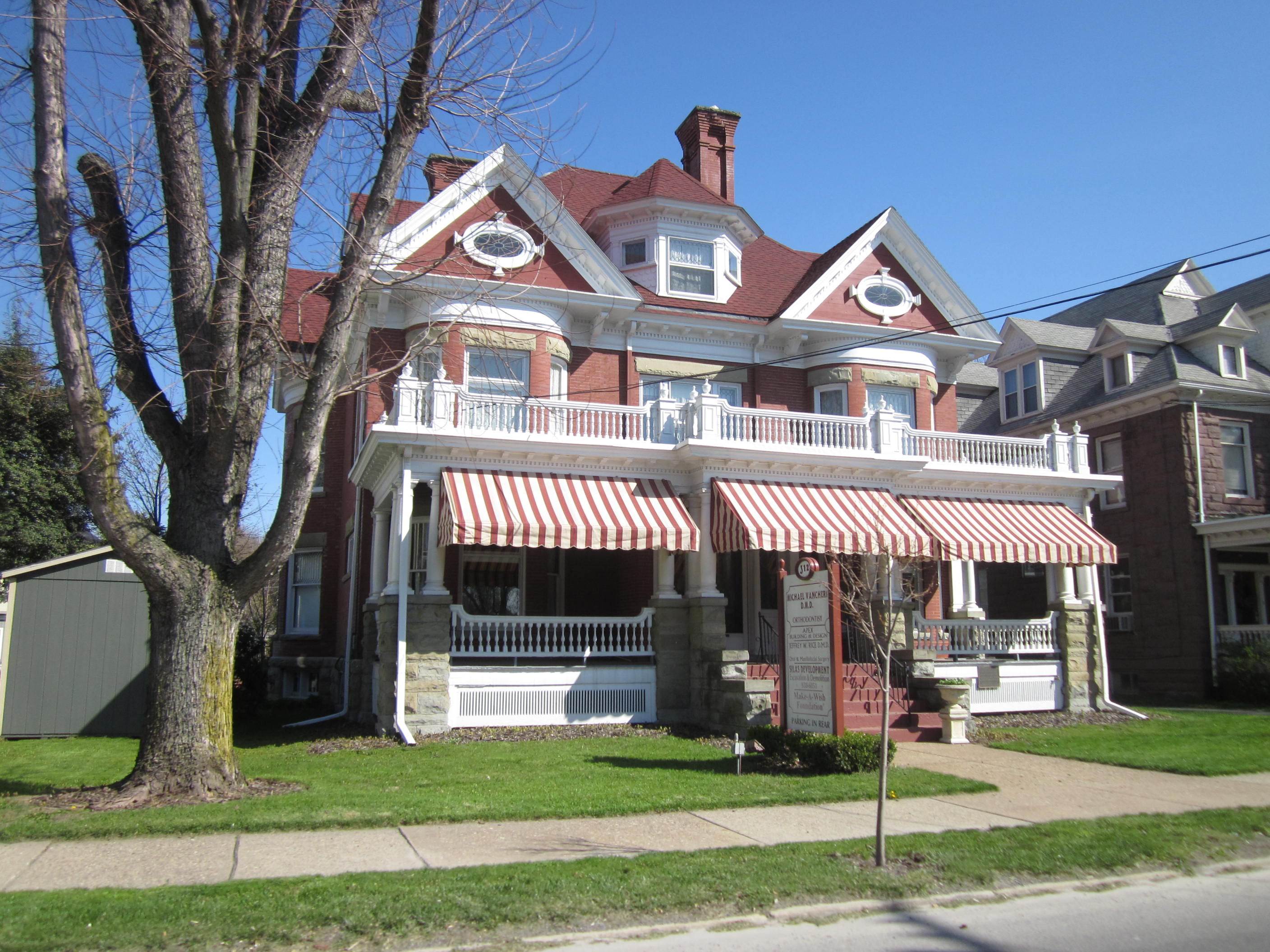
- Kurtz House, April 2012

- Location within Pennsylvania Location within the United States
- Location: 312 W. Mahoning St., Punxsutawney, Pennsylvania
- Coordinates: 40°56′35″N 78°58′22″W
- Area: less than one acre
- Built: 1904
- Built by: Park, Henry C.; Harl, McKean
- Architectural style: Colonial Revival
- NRHP reference No.: 88001158
- Added to NRHP: July 28, 1988

The T. M. Kurtz House, also known as the Pennsylvania Memorial Home, is an historic home that is located in Punxsutawney, Jefferson County, Pennsylvania, United States.

It was added to the National Register of Historic Places in 1988.

== History and architectural features ==
Built in 1904, this historic structure is a three-story, L-shaped, brick dwelling that was designed in the Colonial Revival-style. It features a broad verandah and bow-front bay windows. It was the home of Theodore M. Kurtz (1868-1945), a prominent local businessman and member of the Pennsylvania State Senate.
