= Brookville Historic District (Brookville, Pennsylvania) =

Historic district in Pennsylvania, United States

- U.S. National Register of Historic Places
- U.S. Historic district
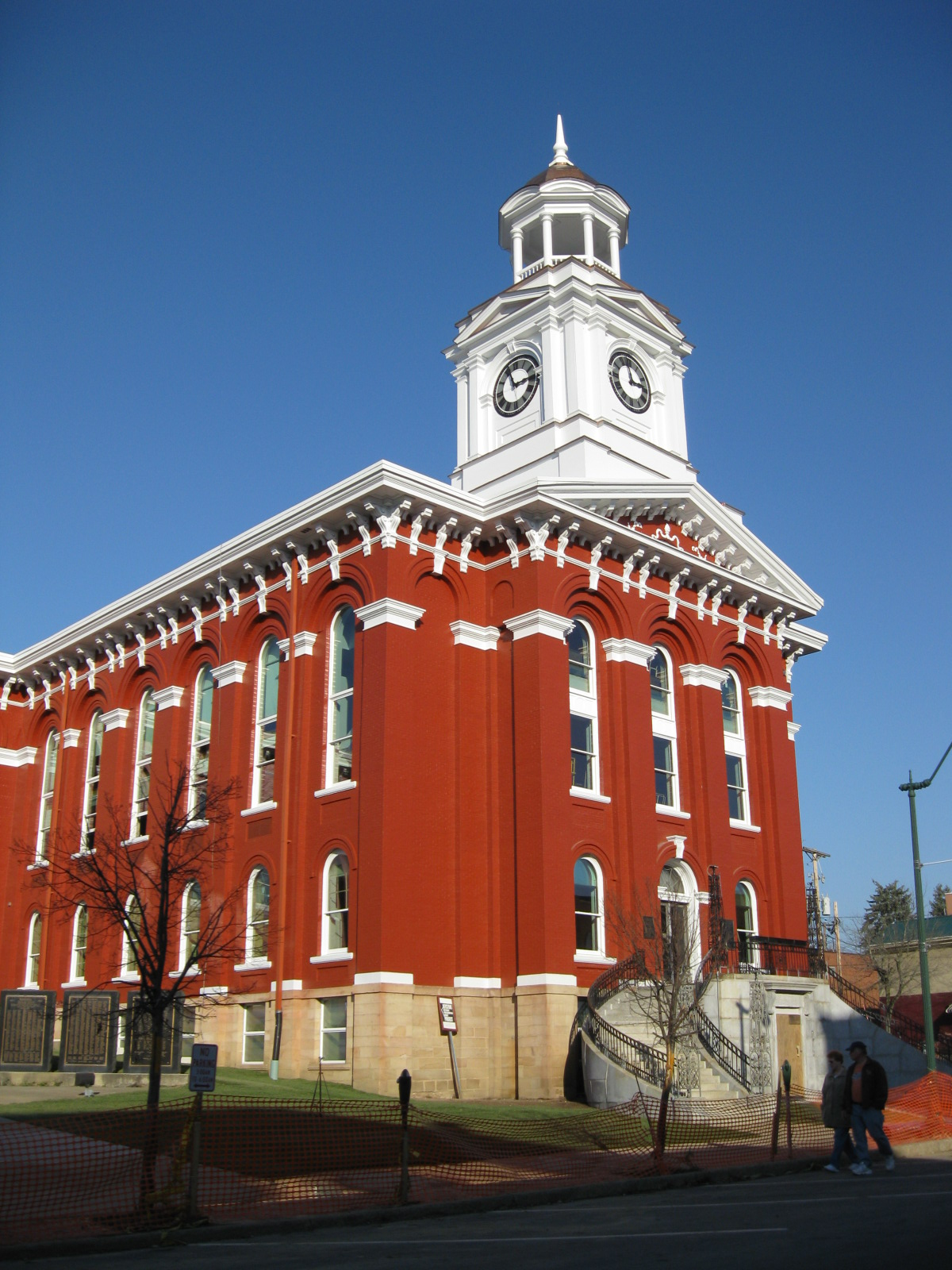
- Jefferson County Courthouse, November 2009

- Location within Pennsylvania Location within the United States
- Location: Roughly bounded by RR tracks, Franklin Ave., Church and Main Sts., Brookville, Pennsylvania
- Coordinates: 41°9′37″N 79°4′58″W
- Area: 90 acres (36 ha)
- Built: 1838
- Architectural style: Late 19th and 20th Century Revivals, Late Victorian
- NRHP reference No.: 84003409
- Added to NRHP: June 7, 1984

Brookville Historic District is a national historic district located at Brookville, Jefferson County, Pennsylvania. The district includes 263 contributing buildings in the central business district and surrounding residential areas of Brookville. The buildings date between about 1838 and 1930, and include notable examples of vernacular and high style Late Victorian style architecture. Notable buildings include the Judge Elijah Heath House (1836), Railroad House Hotel (1851), Blood Block (1875-1876), Marlin Opera House Block (1883-1884), McKnight Building, Northside School (1939), Methodist Episcopal Church (1910, rebuilt 1922-1923), Holy Trinity Episcopal Church (1872), Jenks Foundry (1878), Brookville Y.M.C.A. (1915), Columbia Theater (1918-1919), Jefferson County Courthouse (1867), Brookville Borough Building, and U.S. Post Office. Located in the district and separately listed are the Brookville Presbyterian Church and Manse, Joseph E. Hall House, and Gray-Taylor House.

It was added to the National Register of Historic Places in 1984.

== Gallery ==
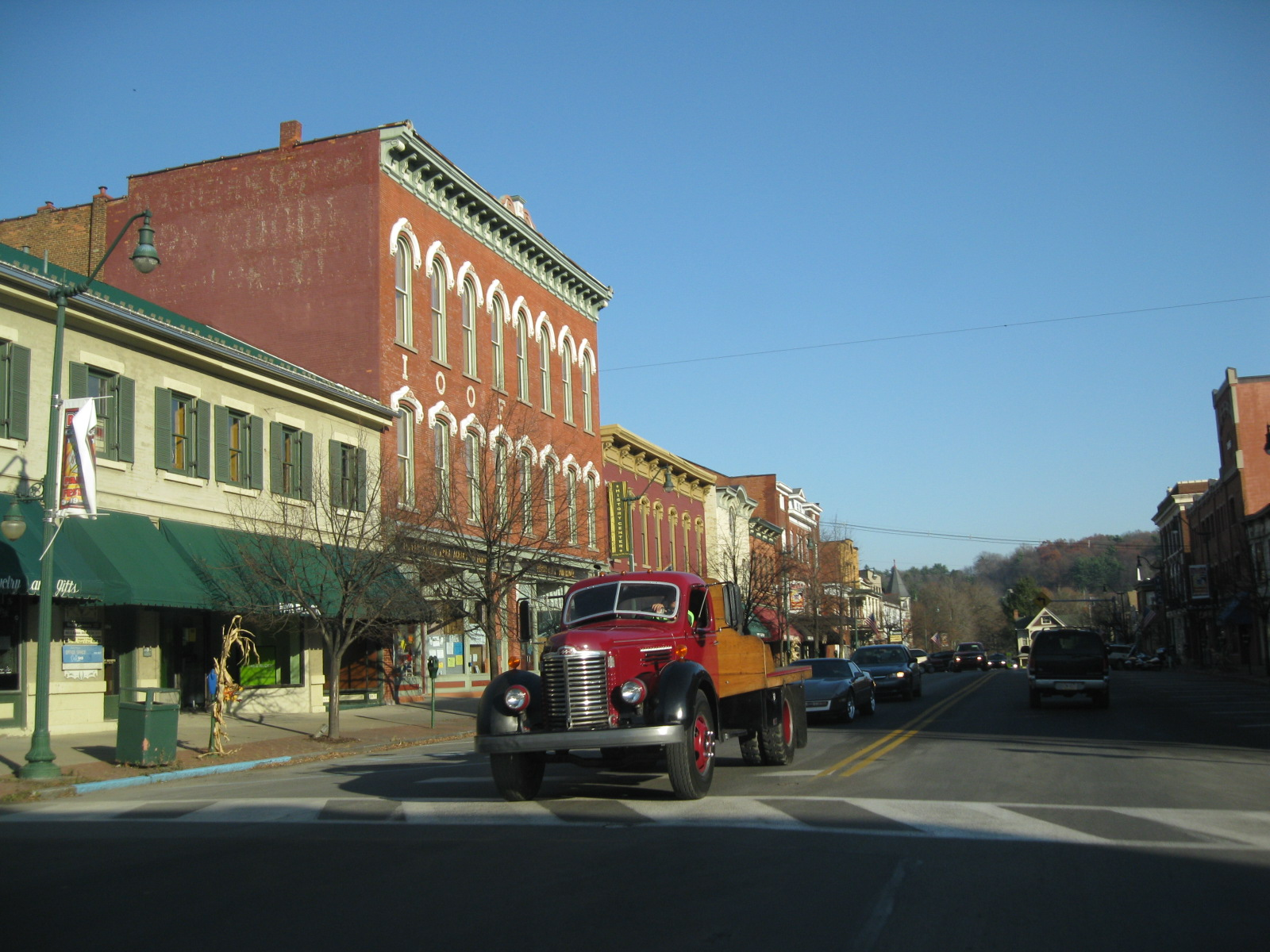
Downtown Brookville, November 2009

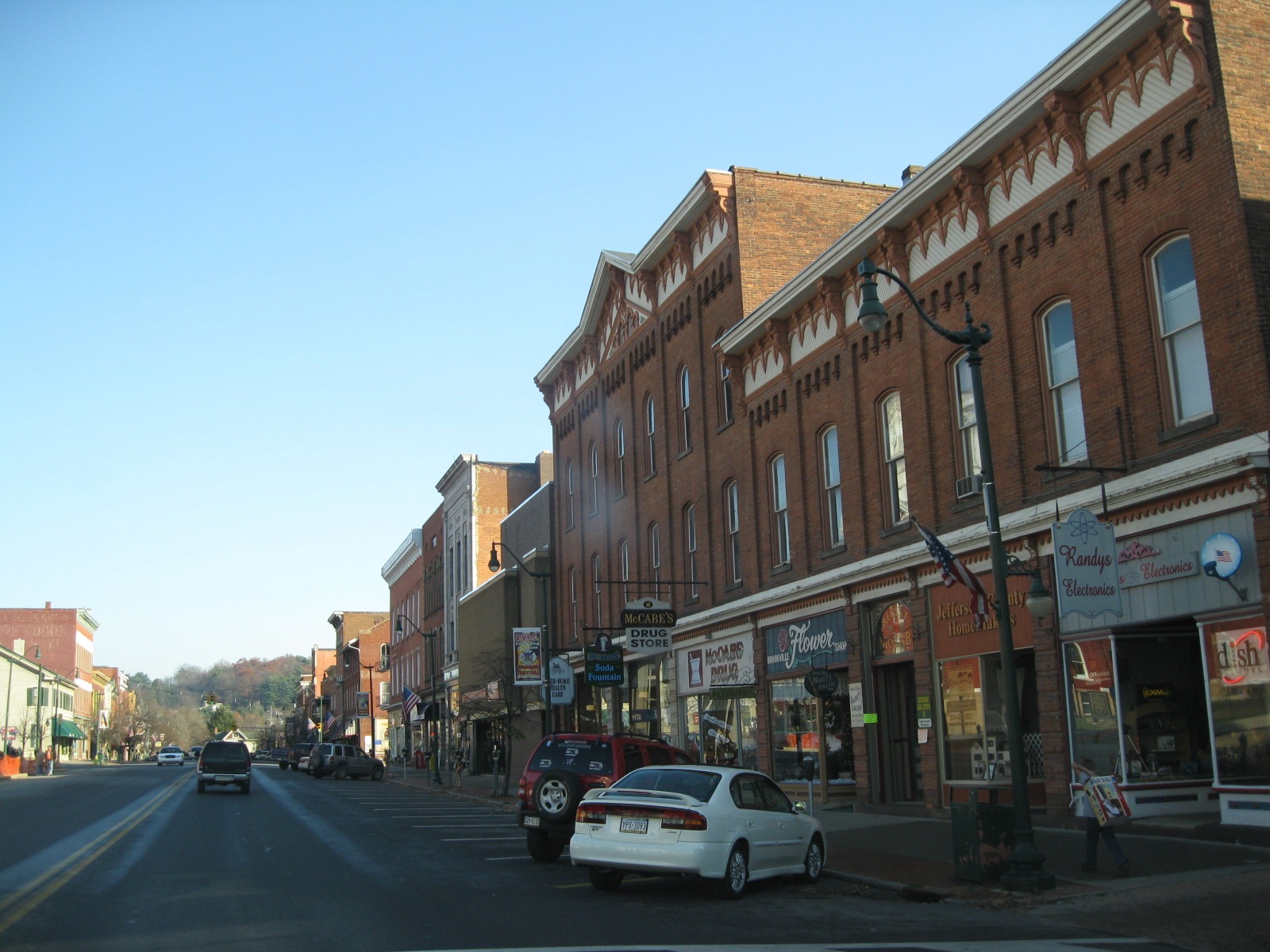
Downtown Brookville, November 2009
