= Ruggero Cobelli =

Ruggero (de) Cobelli (5 April 1838 – 5 September 1921) was an Italian entomologist who specialised in Orthoptera, Hemiptera and Hymenoptera.

Born in Rovereto and the brother of Giovanni Cobelli, Ruggero Cobelli was a physician. His collection of Hymenoptera, Orthoptera and Cicadidae is in the Museo Civico Rovereto.
