= Crenshaw, Pennsylvania =

Unincorporated community in Pennsylvania, US

- Census-designated place
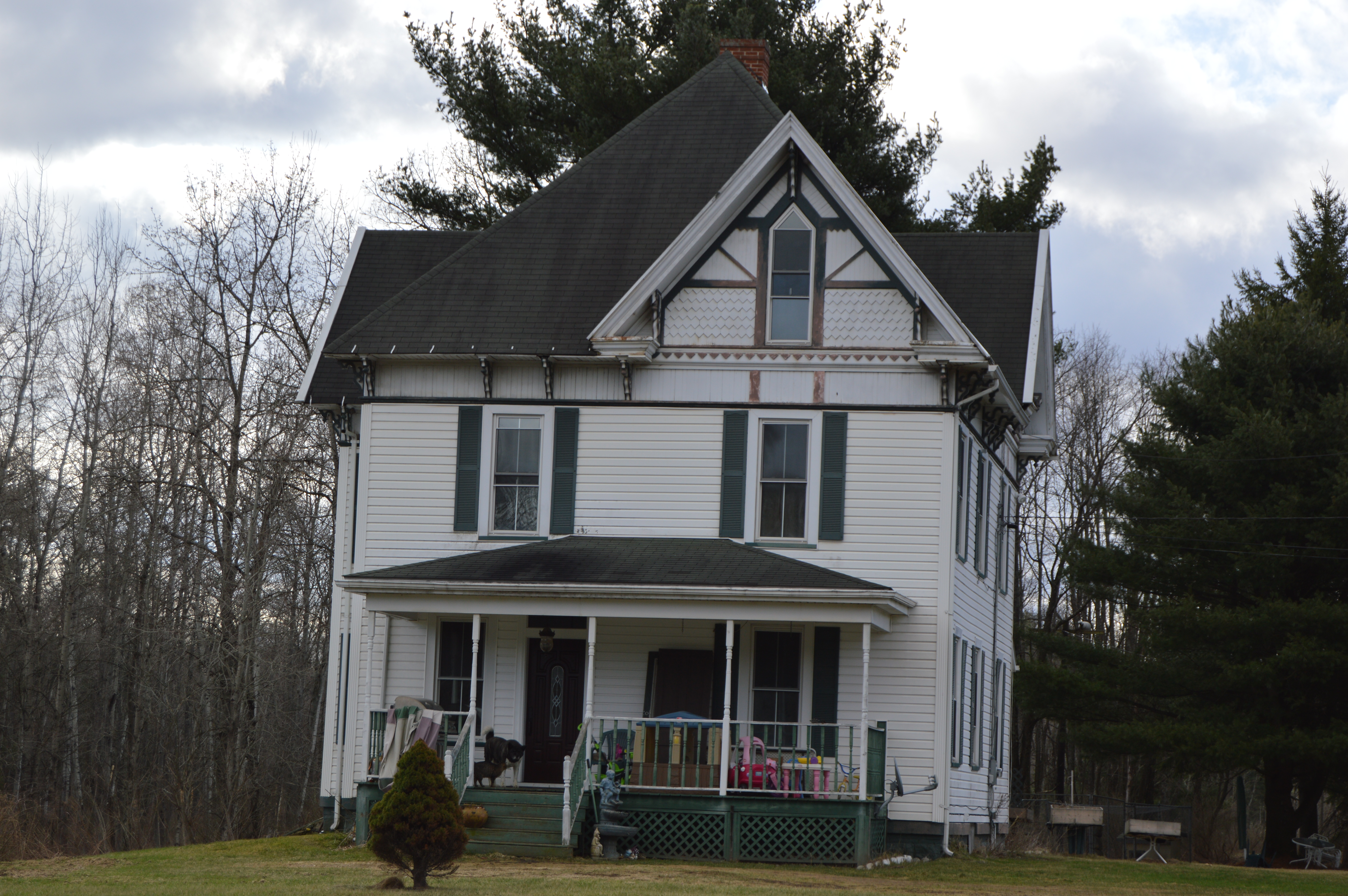
- The Redferd Segers House, on the National Register of Historic Places

- Location within Pennsylvania Location within the United States
- Coordinates: 41°14′55″N 78°45′15″W
- Country: United States
- State: Pennsylvania
- County: Jefferson
- Township: Snyder

Area
  - Total: 1.12 sq mi (2.89 km^{2})
  - Land: 1.10 sq mi (2.84 km^{2})
  - Water: 0.019 sq mi (0.05 km^{2})
- Elevation: 1,480 ft (450 m)

Population (2020)
  - Total: 423
  - Density: 386.2/sq mi (149.11/km^{2})
- Time zone: UTC-5 (Eastern (EST))
  - Summer (DST): UTC-4 (EDT)
- FIPS code: 42-17040
- GNIS feature ID: 2630002

Crenshaw is an unincorporated community and census-designated place in Snyder Township, Jefferson County in the U.S. state of Pennsylvania. It is approximately 2 miles (3 km) east of the borough of Brockway on U.S. Route 219. As of the 2010 census, the population was 468 residents.

== Demographics ==
Historical population
Census	Pop.	Note	%±
2020	423		—
U.S. Decennial Census

== History ==
The railroad was extended to Crenshaw around 1882. A post office was established at Crenshaw in 1886, and remained in operation until 1967.
