= Snyder Township, Pennsylvania =

Snyder Township may refer to places in the U.S. state of Pennsylvania:

- Snyder Township, Blair County, Pennsylvania
- Snyder Township, Jefferson County, Pennsylvania
