= Eleanor Conway =

Eleanor Conway may refer to:

== Fictional characters ==
- Elly Conway, in the Australian soap opera Neighbours

== People ==
- Eleanor Madison née Conway (1731–1829), Virginia planter, mother of President Madison
- Eleanor Conway, a married name of Eleanor Schano (1932–2020), American journalist, widow of Edward B. Conway
- Eleanor Mitchell Wright Conway, wife of American general Theodore J. Conway (1909–1990)
- Ellen or Eleanor, mother of Edward Conway, 1st Viscount Conway (1564–1631)

== See also ==
- Elizabeth Conway (disambiguation)
