= Brockway Area School District =

School district in Pennsylvania

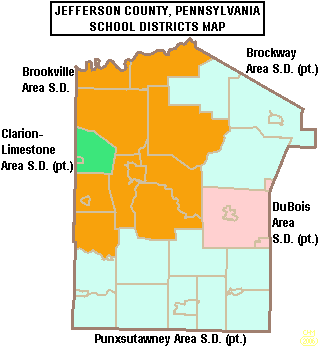

Address
- 40 North Street Brockway, Elk County, Jefferson County, Pennsylvania, 15824; United States

District information
- Type: Public

Students and staff
- District mascot: Rovers

Other information
- Website: www.brockway.k12.pa.us

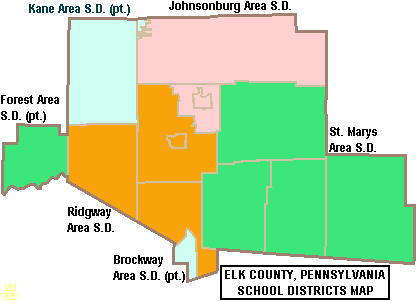
Map of Elk County, Pennsylvania School Districts

The Brockway Area School District is a small, rural public school district located in north west Pennsylvania, US. The District encompasses approximately 147 square miles (380 km^{2}) spanning portions of two counties. In Elk County it covers a small portion of Horton Township. In Jefferson County it covers the Borough of Brockway and Polk Township, Snyder Township and Washington Township. The district operates one elementary school and Brockway Area Junior/Senior High School. The district is with the Riverview Intermediate Unit 6 region. The Intermediate Unit provides support services and therapy to special education students. It also provides training to school personnel.

== Demographics ==
According to 2000 federal census data, Brockway Area School District served a resident population of 8,455. The resident population declined to 7,537 people in 2010. In 2009, the district residents’ per capita income was $17,828, while the median family income was $40,732. In the Commonwealth, the median family income was $49,501 and the United States median family income was $49,445, in 2010.

== Schools ==
- Brockway Area Elementary School
- Brockway Area Junior/Senior High School

== Extracurriculars ==
The district offers a variety of clubs, activities and interscholastic athletics.

=== Sports ===
The District funds:

Boys

- Baseball – A
- Basketball- AA
- Cross Country – A
- Football – A
- Golf – AA
- Soccer – A
- Tennis – AA
- Wrestling – AA

Girls

- Basketball – A
- Cross Country – A
- Golf – AA
- Soccer (Fall) – A
- Softball – A
- Girls' Tennis – AA
- Volleyball

Junior high school sports

Boys

- Basketball
- Football
- Soccer
- Wrestling

Girls

- Basketball
- Volleyball

According to PIAA directory July 2012
