= 11 Alive =

11 Alive may refer to:

- WXIA-TV, a television station in Atlanta that has used the branding 11 Alive since 1976
- WPIX, a television station in New York City that formerly used the 11 Alive branding from 1976 to 1986
- WPXI, a television station in Pittsburgh that formerly used the 11 Alive branding from 1976 to 1979
