= Elizabeth Conway =

Elizabeth Conway or variants may refer to:

- Elly Conway, fictional character in the Kingsman franchise and spin-off Argylle
  - Elizabeth "Elly" Conway, pseudonym for Terry Hayes and Tammy Cohen, when writing the Argylle spy novels
- Elizabeth Conway, fictional character in 2006 video game Time Crisis 4
- Elizabeth Davenport Conway, wife of American politician Jack Conway (born 1967)
- Elizabeth Conway, daughter of American politician Henry Conway (1749–1812) of the Conway-Johnson family

== See also ==
- Eleanor Conway (disambiguation)
