= Brockway Area Junior/Senior High School =

School in Brockway, Pennsylvania, United States

Brockway Junior and Senior High School
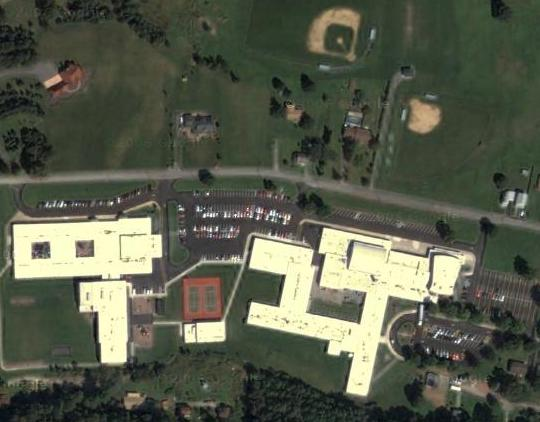
- USGS image of Brockway Area HS and MS

Location
- 100 Alexander Street; Brockway, Jefferson County, Pennsylvania 15824; United States
- Coordinates: 41.2512°N 78.8046°W

Information
- School type: Public, Intermediate & Secondary
- School district: Brockway Area School District
- Principal: Mark Dippold
- Teaching staff: 37.65 (FTE)
- Grades: 7th–12th
- Enrollment: 408 (2023–2024)
- Student to teacher ratio: 10.84
- Colors: Red and Black
- Mascot: Rover
- Feeder schools: Brockway Area Elementary School
- Website: Brockway Area High School

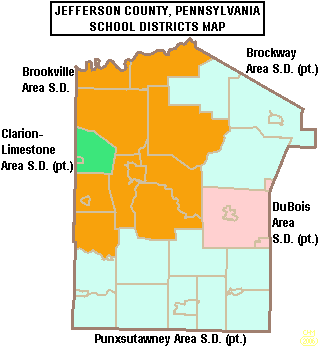
Map of Jefferson County, Pennsylvania School Districts

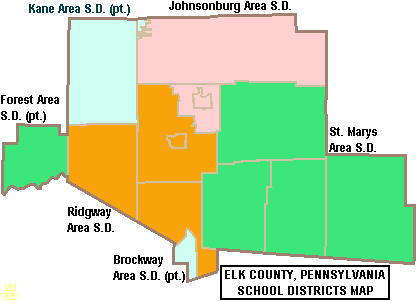
Map of Elk County, Pennsylvania School Districts

Brockway Area Junior and Senior High School are the only intermediate and secondary schools in the Brockway Area School District. The junior and senior high school facilities are located in Brockway, Jefferson County, Pennsylvania, United States. According to the National Center for Education Statistics, in 2010, the school reported an enrollment of 490 pupils in grades 7th through 12th. The school employed 40 teachers yielding a student teacher ratio of 12:1.

== Extracurriculars ==
The district offers a variety of clubs, activities and sports.

=== High school athletics ===
Brockway Area participates in PIAA District IX.

Sport Name	Boys	Girls
Baseball / Softball	Class A	Class A
Basketball	Class AA	Class AA
Cross country	Class AA	Class AA
Football	Class AA	
Golf	Class AAAA	Class AAAA
Soccer	Class A	Class A
Tennis	Class AA	Class AA (Team)
Volleyball		Class A
Wrestling	Class AA	
