= Julie Bologna =

American meteorologist

Julie Bologna is an American television meteorologist. Bologna was with WFAA in Dallas, Texas from April 7, 2012, to April 12, 2015, prior to which she was the chief meteorologist for WPXI in Pittsburgh, Pennsylvania until 2011.

== Early life ==
Bologna was born in Center Township, Pennsylvania. She graduated from Penn State University in 1994 with a degree in journalism and received her broadcast meteorology certificate from Mississippi State University.

While at Penn State, she received an internship at WDVE in Pittsburgh.

== Career ==
After graduation, Bologna began her career at low-power WMBA-AM in Ambridge, Pennsylvania. She then worked at stations in Philadelphia, Harrisburg, Altoona, Steubenville, and Wheeling before becoming the morning and noon meteorologist at WPXI in Pittsburgh in 1999. In 2004, she left WPXI for a similar position with KTVT in Dallas-Fort Worth before returning to WPXI in 2008. Bologna left WPXI on July 13, 2011. Bologna has received two local Emmys for her weather reporting. She has also co-authored a book entitled The Complete Idiot's Guide to Extreme Weather. She was, but is no longer working at WFAA Channel 8 in Dallas. Julie is now selling and renting homes in Texas.
