= Brockway station =

- Brockwayville Passenger Depot, Buffalo, Rochester and Pittsburgh Railroad
- U.S. National Register of Historic Places
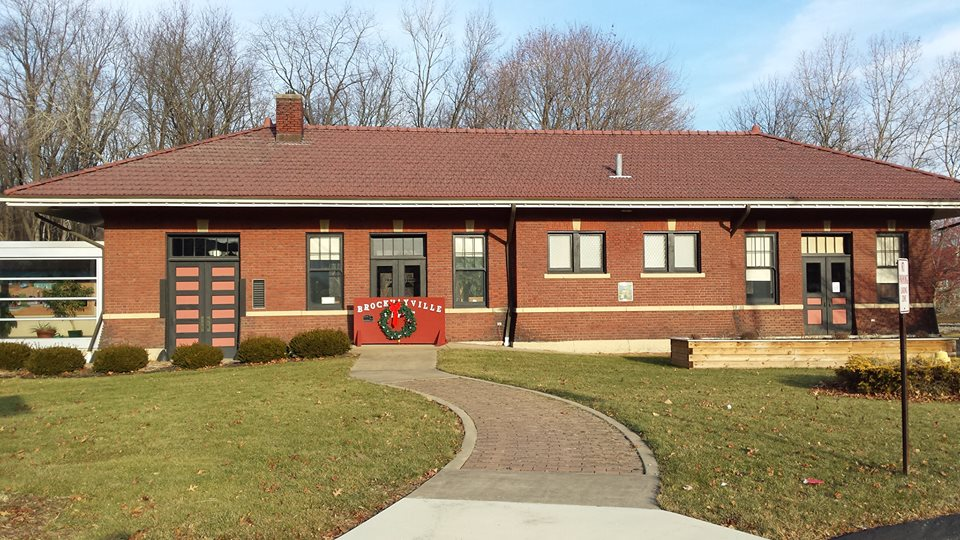

- Location within Pennsylvania Location within the United States
- Location: Alexander Street at Fourth Ave., Brockway, Pennsylvania
- Coordinates: 41°15′4″N 78°47′36″W
- Area: 1 acre (0.40 ha)
- Built: 1913
- Architectural style: Colonial Revival
- NRHP reference No.: 03000489
- Added to NRHP: May 29, 2003

Brockway station is a historic railway station located at Brockway, Jefferson County, Pennsylvania. It was built in 1913 by the Buffalo, Rochester and Pittsburgh Railroad, and is a one-story, rectangular brick building with Colonial Revival-style details. It sits on a poured cement foundation and has a hipped roof covered in red ceramic tile.

The Baltimore and Ohio Railroad operated both daytime and nighttime trains through the station on the BR&P route between Lackawanna Terminal in Buffalo and Baltimore and Ohio Station in Pittsburgh. Additionally, the company operated a local Buffalo to DuBois, Pennsylvania train, making stops at the station. B&O passenger service to Brockway continued up to 1955, the final year of service on the BR&P line. It is the only surviving passenger station in Jefferson County.

It was added to the National Register of Historic Places in 2003 as the Brockwayville Passenger Depot, Buffalo, Rochester and Pittsburgh Railroad.

Preceding station	Baltimore and Ohio Railroad	Following station
Lanes Mills toward Pittsburgh	Buffalo, Rochester and Pittsburgh Railway	Carman toward Buffalo
