= Kevin Benson =

American meteorologist (born 1959)

- Born: 1959 (age 66–67); Brockway, Pennsylvania
- Education: Gannon University
- Occupation: Television meteorologist

Kevin Benson (born 1959) is an American meteorologist. He is best known for his tenure with WPXI in Pittsburgh, Pennsylvania. He is a member of the National Weather Association and the American Meteorological Society, which has given him the AMS seal of approval.

Benson was born in Brockway, Pennsylvania and graduated from Gannon University in Erie, Pennsylvania.

He held early radio jobs in Erie and DuBois, Pennsylvania, subsequently becoming a weather forecaster on Erie's WJET-TV. He then became a weekend-afternoon DJ at Pittsburgh's WTAE-AM. He joined WPXI, Pittsburgh's NBC affiliate, in September 1987 as part-time weatherman. In June 1990, he became a WPXI co-anchor on the Pittsburgh television market's first Saturday morning news program. The experiment was a success and the format was expanded to include Sunday mornings.

While working part-time at WPXI, Benson pursued a second career in beer sales. During the early 1980s, he worked for Stroh Brewery Company's Erie offices; he was a brand manager for Iron City Beer from 1984 to 1987; and from the late 1980s to the early 1990s, he helped rescue a struggling Anheuser-Busch wholesale distributor in Canonsburg, Pennsylvania. These jobs took him throughout every small town in Western Pennsylvania, allowing him to become intimately familiar with the geography of the region, a skill that aided him as a weatherman.

Benson was described to have had his TV career's "defining moment" during the Blizzard of 1993, in which he and a co-anchor were on the air for most of an entire weekend. Co-workers were unable to get to the station to relieve them because of the snow-covered roads. Benson said the incident "really put me on the map".

In 1998, WPXI hired Benson full-time.

He graduated in 2003 from the meteorology training program at Mississippi State University, receiving a certificate in broadcast meteorology.

A Pittsburgh Post-Gazette reporter criticized a 2006 WPXI gasoline giveaway presented by Benson because it allowed "commercialism to invade the bounds of the newscast".

After reporting the weather on weekends for almost all of his years at WPXI, the station moved Benson to weekday mornings in April 2012. Benson returned to weekends in December 2013.

Benson was charged with DUI as a result of a traffic stop by a PA State trooper on September 19, 2019. The stop occurred on Interstate 79 not Interstate 70 south of Pittsburgh, after blood tests at a local hospital he was found to be 3 times the legal limit. He was officially charged on October 10, 2019. They also found trace amounts of cocaine in his system. He was fired from WPXI TV shortly thereafter.

Scott Trabandt, WPXI News director, confirmed on November 19, 2019 that Benson was no longer with the station. Trabandt declined to elaborate on the circumstances. When reached by phone by the Tribune-Review, Benson declined to comment. There have been no reports as to whether Mr. Benson was dismissed by the station, or if he resigned.
