= Asa Aarons =

American advice columnist

- Born: Asa Smith; October 20, 1956 (age 70)
- Occupation: Journalist
- Spouse: Noreen Seebacher
- Children: 5
- Writing career
- Language: English

Asa Aarons (born Asa Smith, October 20, 1956) is an American consumer reporter, photojournalist, and co-creator of "Just Ask Asa!" His reports focus on the problems, concerns, and realities of everyday life, ranging from false advertising claims to credit card rip-offs and business swindles. Aarons has appeared on television stations in cities including New York City, Detroit, and Pittsburgh. He appeared on WNBC in NYC from 1993 until the NBC 2.0 budget cuts in 2007.

== Biography ==
He established the proprietary "Ask Asa" brand and developed the expression into a catchphrase for consumers seeking assistance. His work was featured on television and the station's mobile Internet-based platform. Following WNBC, he was hired by local cable station NY1 News as its employment reporter.

In 1998, he began writing a newspaper column for the New York Daily News, which appeared four times a week. He has made numerous guest appearances on The Today Show, nationally televised talk shows such as Maury Povich and Sally Jesse Raphael, and on programs on MSNBC and CNBC. Before moving to New York, Aarons appeared from 1990 to 1993 on WDIV in Detroit, where he also wrote a consumer column for The Detroit News and hosted a consumer call-in radio shows. He worked at WPXI in Pittsburgh from 1984 until 1990, where he also hosted a 30-minute consumer/health show called "Your Money or Your Life."

He worked in several smaller television markets in Ohio early in his career: Toledo, Youngstown, Cincinnati and Cleveland. He won Emmy awards for stories in Cleveland (1982), Detroit (1992) and New York City (2007).

Aarons is a native of Toledo, Ohio. He is married to writer Noreen Seebacher. They have five children and live in the Savannah, Georgia, area.
