= Brockway, Pennsylvania =

Borough in Pennsylvania, US

- Borough
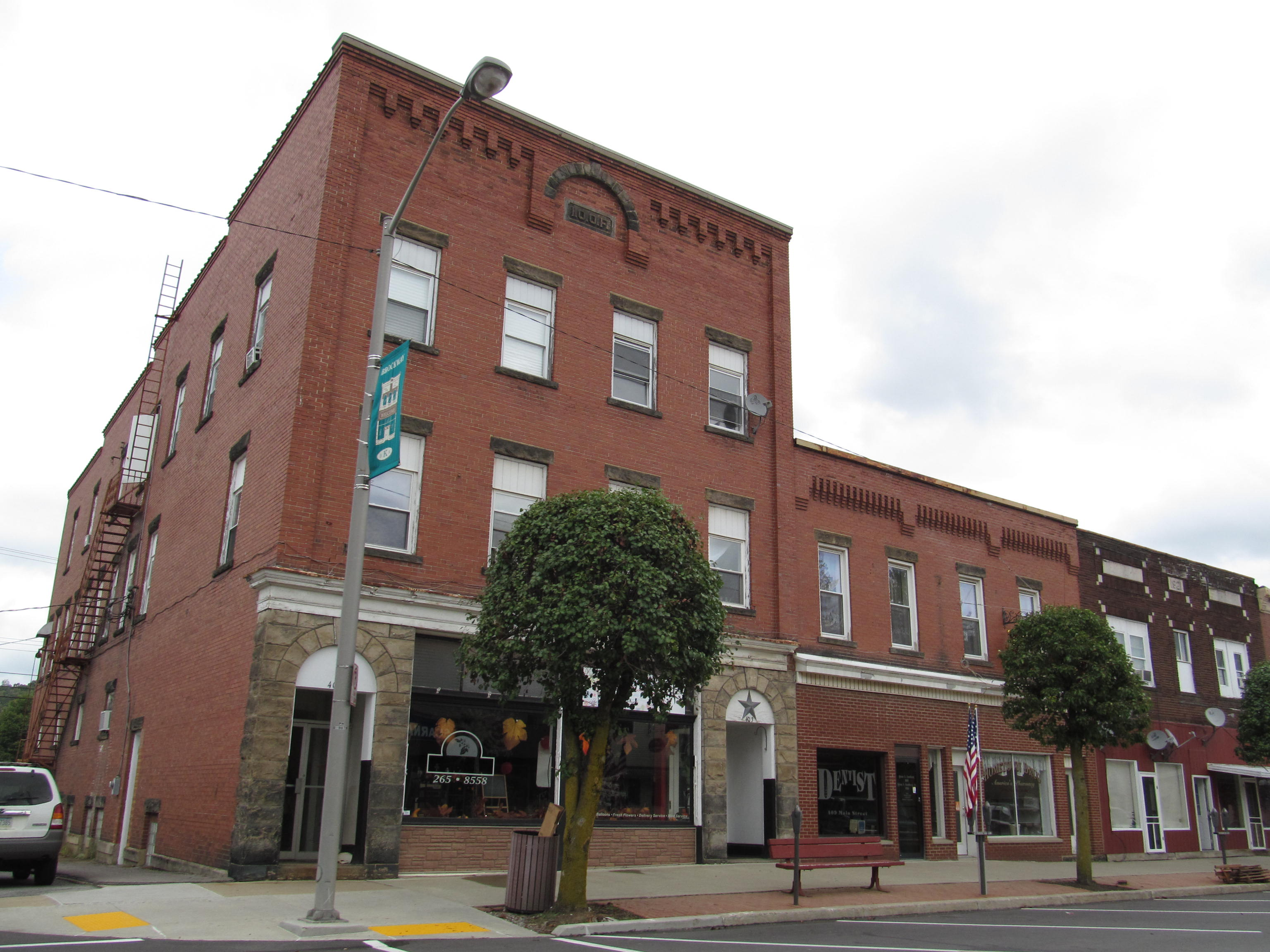
- Downtown Brockway

- Location of Brockway in Jefferson County, Pennsylvania

- Location within Pennsylvania Location within the United States
- Coordinates: 41°14′52″N 78°47′29″W
- Country: United States
- State: Pennsylvania
- County: Jefferson
- Settled: 1822
- Incorporated: 1883

Government
  - Type: Borough Council

Area
  - Total: 1.22 sq mi (3.15 km^{2})
  - Land: 1.19 sq mi (3.07 km^{2})
  - Water: 0.031 sq mi (0.08 km^{2})
- Elevation: 1,499 ft (457 m)

Population (2020)
  - Total: 2,276
  - Density: 1,921.0/sq mi (741.72/km^{2})
- Time zone: UTC-5 (Eastern (EST))
  - Summer (DST): UTC-4 (EDT)
- ZIP code: 15824
- Area code: 814
- FIPS code: 42-08960
- Website: https://brockwayborough.gov/

Brockway is a borough in Jefferson County, Pennsylvania, United States. The population was 2,276 at the 2020 census.

== History ==
The community was laid out as "Brockwayville" in 1836. The borough was named for Alonzo and John S. Brockway, who came to the site in 1822. A post office called "Brockwayville" was established in 1829, and the name of the post office was changed to "Brockway" in 1925.

The Brockwayville Passenger Depot, Buffalo, Rochester and Pittsburgh Railroad was added to the National Register of Historic Places in 2003.

The Brockway Glass Company Inc. was founded in 1907 in by the Brockway Machine Bottle Company (which later became Brockway Glass). Brockway manufactured and sold glass containers and tubing, along with plastic products manufactured through wholly owned subsidiaries. In 1964 Brockway bought several Hazel-Atlas Glass Company factories from the Continental Can Company as part of a lawsuit settlement. In 1987 Owens-Illinois made a bid of $60 per share (worth $750million) to acquire Brockway, which was met with resistance by the FTC. After a federal district judge denied the FTC's request for an injunction, Owens-Illinois acquired Brockway's shares.

An armed standoff took place just outside of Brockway on September 26, 2013, when two Pennsylvania State Police troopers were shot at while serving a warrant at the suspect's home. Residents and students in Brockway were ordered to shelter-in-place. The suspect was 60-year-old Kenneth Lees, who was found dead from a self-inflicted gunshot wound when police entered the building.

== Geography ==
Brockway is located in northeastern Jefferson County, in the valley of Little Toby Creek, a northward-flowing tributary of the Clarion River and part of the Allegheny River watershed. U.S. Route 219 passes through the borough, leading northeast 17 miles (27 km) to Ridgway and south 10 miles (16 km) to DuBois. Pennsylvania Route 28 has its eastern terminus at US 219 in Brockway and leads west 18 miles (29 km) to Brookville.

According to the United States Census Bureau, the borough has a total area of 1.18 square miles (3.05 km^{2}), of which 1.14 square miles (2.96 km^{2}) are land and 0.03 square miles (0.08 km^{2}), or 2.69%, are water.

== Demographics ==
Historical population
Census	Pop.	Note	%±
1880	360		—
1890	929		158.1%
1900	1,777		91.3%
1910	1,898		6.8%
1920	2,369		24.8%
1930	2,690		13.6%
1940	2,709		0.7%
1950	2,650		−2.2%
1960	2,563		−3.3%
1970	2,529		−1.3%
1980	2,376		−6.0%
1990	2,207		−7.1%
2000	2,182		−1.1%
2010	2,072		−5.0%
2020	2,276		9.8%

As of the census of 2000, there were 2,182 people, 911 households, and 584 families residing in the borough. The population density was 1,879.5 inhabitants per square mile (725.7/km^{2}). There were 994 housing units at an average density of 856.2 per square mile (330.6/km^{2}). The racial makeup of the borough was 99.68% White, 0.05% Native American, 0.18% Asian, and 0.09% from two or more races. Hispanic or Latino of any race were 0.09% of the population.

There were 911 households, out of which 28.9% had children under the age of 18 living with them, 49.0% were married couples living together, 11.5% had a female householder with no husband present, and 35.8% were non-families. 33.2% of all households were made up of individuals, and 20.5% had someone living alone who was 65 years of age or older. The average household size was 2.30 and the average family size was 2.91.

In the borough the population was spread out, with 23.6% under the age of 18, 7.0% from 18 to 24, 26.3% from 25 to 44, 18.4% from 45 to 64, and 24.7% who were 65 years of age or older. The median age was 40 years. For every 100 females there were 90.6 males. For every 100 females age 18 and over, there were 83.3 males.

The median income for a household in the borough was $34,556, and the median income for a family was $41,278. Males had a median income of $34,950 versus $21,875 for females. The per capita income for the borough was $18,303. About 5.7% of families and 9.9% of the population were below the poverty line, including 12.8% of those under age 18 and 9.6% of those age 65 or over.

=== Education ===
- Brockway Area School District
- Brockway Area Junior/Senior High School

== Notable people ==
- Brockway is the hometown of Joe Scarnati, former President Pro Tempore of the State Senate.
- Brockway is the birthplace of Andrew Thomas Kearney, founder of the management consulting firm A.T. Kearney and winner of the Presidential Medal of Freedom.
- Brockway is also the hometown of Kevin Benson, retired meteorologist for WPXI, Channel 11 News, based in Pittsburgh, Pennsylvania.
- Eustace L. Brockway, former member of the Wisconsin State Assembly, was born in what was then Brockwayville.
