= Snyder Township, Jefferson County, Pennsylvania =

Township in Pennsylvania, US

Coordinates: 41°16′00″N 78°48′59″W

- Township
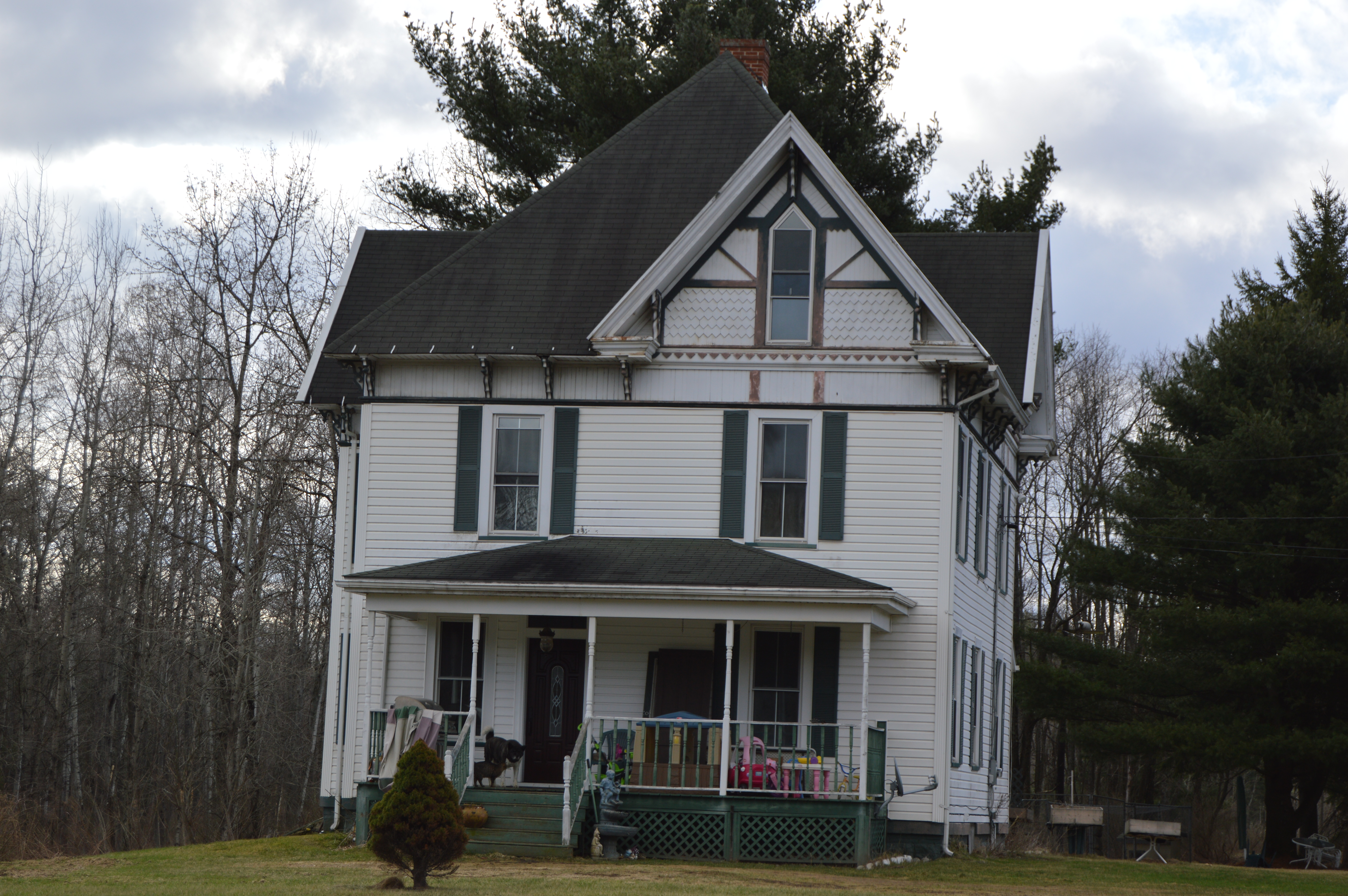
- The Redferd Segers House, a historic site at Crenshaw

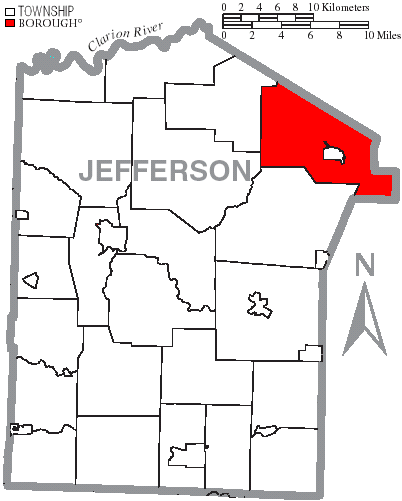
- Map of Jefferson County, Pennsylvania Highlighting Snyder Township

- Map of Jefferson County, Pennsylvania
- Country: United States
- State: Pennsylvania
- County: Jefferson
- Settled: 1822
- Incorporated: 1835

Government
  - Type: A Township of the Second Class, having a three member board of Supervisors

Area
  - Total: 41.46 sq mi (107.38 km^{2})
  - Land: 41.26 sq mi (106.86 km^{2})
  - Water: 0.20 sq mi (0.52 km^{2})

Population (2020)
  - Total: 2,367 ▼
  - Estimate (2023): 2,319
  - Density: 57.37/sq mi (22.15/km^{2})
- Time zone: UTC-5 (Eastern (EST))
  - Summer (DST): UTC-4 (EDT)
- FIPS code: 42-065-71632
- Website: snydertwp.com

Snyder Township is a township in Jefferson County, Pennsylvania, United States. The population was 2,367 at the 2020 census. It was named for Governor of Pennsylvania Simon Snyder.

== History ==
The Redferd Segers House at Crenshaw was added to the National Register of Historic Places in 2000.

== Geography ==
The township is in northeastern Jefferson County, bordered to the northeast by Elk County and to the southeast by Clearfield County. It surrounds the borough of Brockway. Unincorporated communities in the township include Crenshaw, Sugar Hill, Lanes Mills, Erie Junction, and Beechton.

U.S. Route 219 passes through the township as it enters and exits Brockway, leading south to DuBois and northeast to Ridgway. Pennsylvania Route 28 crosses the township, starting in Brockway and leading west to Brookville, the Jefferson county seat.

According to the United States Census Bureau, the township has a total area of 41.5 square miles (107.4 km^{2}), of which 41.3 square miles (106.9 km^{2}) are land and 0.2 square miles (0.5 km^{2}), or 0.48%, are water. Little Toby Creek, a tributary of the Clarion River, crosses the township from east to north. The entire township is within the Allegheny River watershed.

== Demographics ==
Historical population
| Census | Pop. | Note | %± |
|---|---|---|---|
| 1850 | 306 | | — |
| 1860 | 597 | | 95.1% |
| 1870 | 792 | | 32.7% |
| 1880 | 1,048 | | 32.3% |
| 1890 | 2,011 | | 91.9% |
| 1900 | 2,117 | | 5.3% |
| 1910 | 1,796 | | −15.2% |
| 1920 | 1,909 | | 6.3% |
| 1930 | 1,531 | | −19.8% |
| 1940 | 1,654 | | 8.0% |
| 1950 | 1,804 | | 9.1% |
| 1960 | 1,997 | | 10.7% |
| 1970 | 2,280 | | 14.2% |
| 1980 | 2,626 | | 15.2% |
| 1990 | 2,535 | | −3.5% |
| 2000 | 2,432 | | −4.1% |
| 2010 | 2,547 | | 4.7% |
| 2020 | 2,367 | | −7.1% |
| 2023 (est.) | 2,319 | | −2.0% |
U.S. Decennial Census

As of the census of 2000, there were 2,432 people, 937 households, and 707 families residing in the township. The population density was 58.3 inhabitants per square mile (22.5/km^{2}). There were 1,063 housing units at an average density of 25.5 units per square mile (9.8 units/km^{2}). The racial makeup of the township was 99.14% White, 0.04% African American, 0.21% Native American, 0.04% Asian, 0.08% from other races, and 0.49% from two or more races. Hispanic or Latino of any race were 0.33% of the population.

There were 937 households, out of which 32.3% had children under the age of 18 living with them, 64.1% were married couples living together, 7.2% had a female householder with no husband present, and 24.5% were non-families. 20.8% of all households were made up of individuals, and 10.0% had someone living alone who was 65 years of age or older. The average household size was 2.60 and the average family size was 3.02.

In the township the population was spread out, with 24.7% under the age of 18, 6.9% from 18 to 24, 28.1% from 25 to 44, 25.5% from 45 to 64, and 14.8% who were 65 years of age or older. The median age was 40 years. For every 100 females there were 102.0 males. For every 100 females age 18 and over, there were 98.6 males.

The median income for a household in the township was $38,413, and the median income for a family was $41,632. Males had a median income of $34,844 versus $23,011 for females. The per capita income for the township was $18,163. About 2.1% of families and 3.0% of the population were below the poverty line, including 4.3% of those under age 18 and 1.1% of those age 65 or over.
