= Redferd Segers House =

Historic house in Pennsylvania, United States

- U.S. National Register of Historic Places
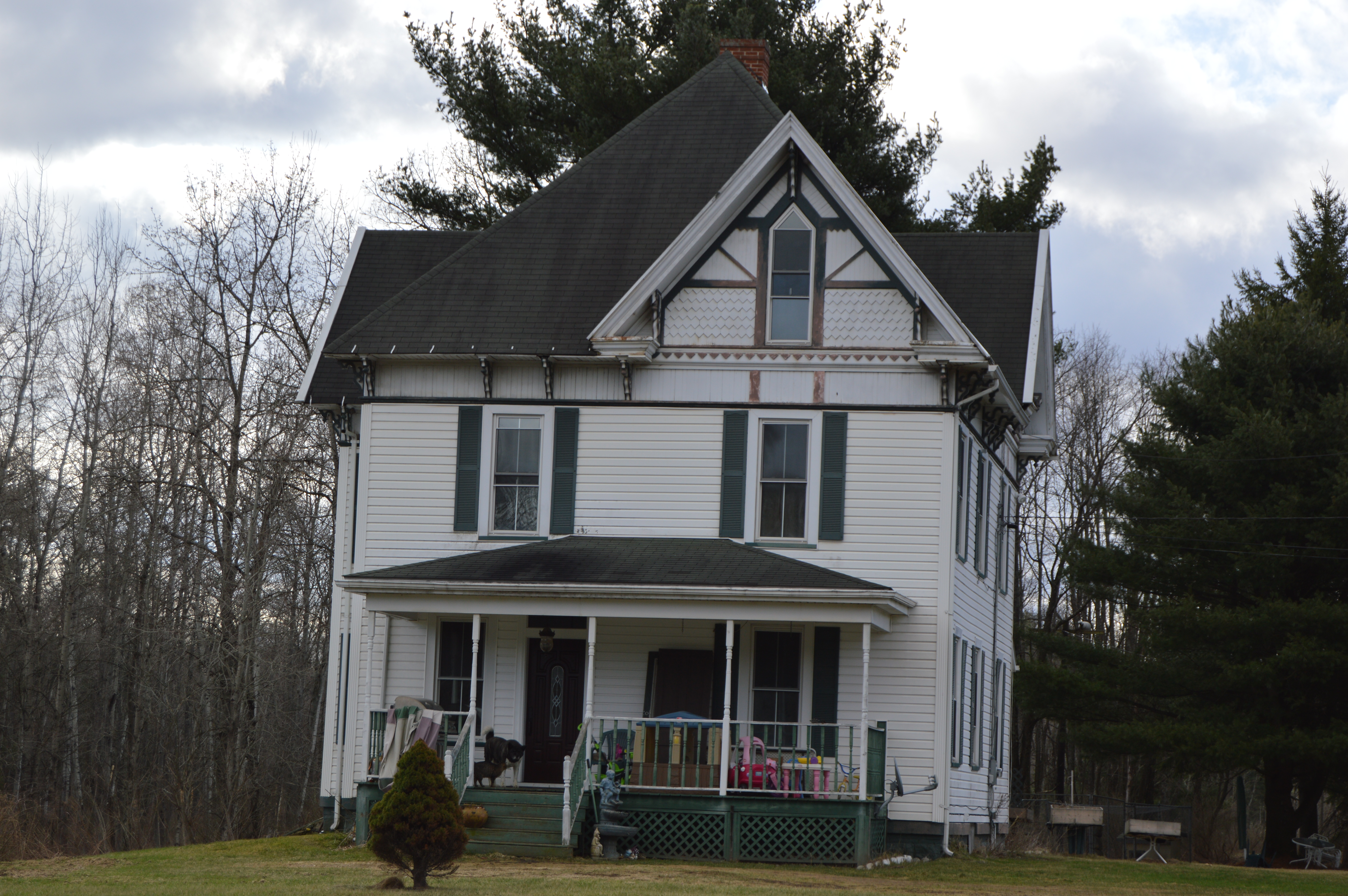
- Front of the house

- Location within Pennsylvania Location within the United States
- Location: U.S. Route 219, opposite Township Route 1025, Snyder Township, Pennsylvania
- Coordinates: 41°14′49″N 78°46′3″W
- Area: less than one acre
- Built: c. 1870
- Architectural style: Stick/eastlake, Gothic Revival, et al.
- NRHP reference No.: 00000447
- Added to NRHP: May 5, 2000

The Redferd Segers House, also known as the Kenneth Hoffman House, is an historic home that is located in Crenshaw in Snyder Township, Jefferson County, Pennsylvania, United States.

It was added to the National Register of Historic Places in 2000.

== History and architectural features ==
Built circa 1870, this historic structure is a 2 1/2-story, L-shaped frame dwelling that sits on a stone foundation. It is an eclectic example of domestic Stick/Eastlake, Gothic Revival, Italianate, and Shingle styles and features a hipped roof with intersecting gables, ornamental cornice, and patterned shingling. Redferd Segers (1834-1913) was a prominent local businessman.
