= Eleanor Schano =

American journalist (1932–2020)

- Eleanor Schano, from a 1972 newspaper.
- Born: Eleanor Martha Schano; July 31, 1932; Pittsburgh, Pennsylvania, U.S.
- Died: November 9, 2020 (aged 88); Pittsburgh, Pennsylvania, U.S.
- Occupations: Journalist, television presenter
- Spouses: Warren Bentley Dana (m. 1955; died 1969) Edward B. Conway (m. 1972; died 1974) John M. Feeney (m. 1982; died 2011)

Eleanor Martha Schano (July 31, 1932 – November 9, 2020) was an American journalist and television presenter based in Pittsburgh.

== Early life ==
Eleanor Schano was born and raised in Green Tree, near Pittsburgh, the daughter of Joseph J. Schano and Eleanor Daley Schano. She graduated from Dormont High School in 1950, and from Duquesne University in 1954. She mentioned the Brenda Starr, Reporter comic strip as one inspiration for her seeking a career in journalism.

== Career ==
Schano was a model and Pittsburgh's first female weather presenter, before becoming a reporter and eventually news anchor in Pittsburgh television. She was the first solo primetime news anchorwoman in Pittsburgh, when she held that position from 1969 to 1974 at WIIC (WPXI). She hosted several programs, including Face to Face (a weekly public affairs discussion), Good Day Pittsburgh (a daily magazine show), AgeWise Weekly and Live Well/Live Long (long-running wellness information programs for older viewers). She also had a longtime on-air presence on KQV radio.

Schano served on the Greater Pittsburgh Commission for Women. She was a board member of the Civic Light Opera and the Carnegie Science Center. In 2009, the Mid-Atlantic chapter of the National Academy of Television Arts and Sciences presented Schano with a lifetime achievement Emmy. Other honors include five Golden Quills and a President's Award from the Press Club of Western Pennsylvania, and a Love Award from the City of Pittsburgh.

Schano was skeptical of the work of the women's rights movement in the 1970s, saying that she had not personally faced gender discrimination. However, she included some stories of gender discrimination in her memoir, Riding the Airwaves: The Life and Televised Times of Eleanor Schano (2006).

== Personal life ==
Schano was married three times. She married her first husband, Warren Bentley Dana, in 1955; he died in 1969. Her second husband was sportscaster Edward B. Conway; he died in 1974. She married her third husband, judge John M. Feeney, in 1982; he died in 2011. Eleanor Schano was survived by two daughters when she died from complications of COVID-19 in November 2020, at age 88.
