= WPXI =

Television station in Pittsburgh

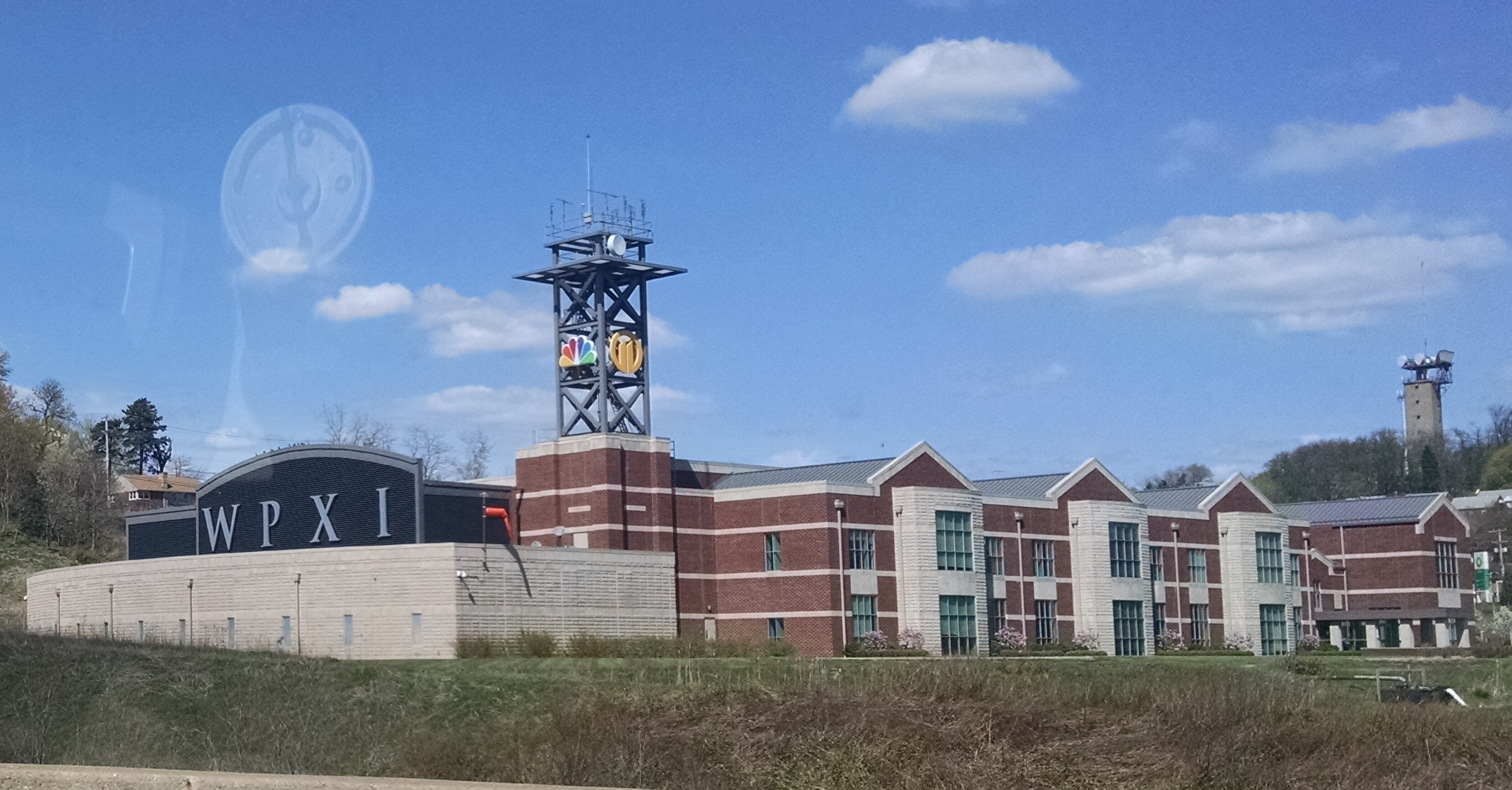
- WPXI's current studios from Interstate 279 northbound.
- Pittsburgh, Pennsylvania; United States
- Channels: Digital: 23 (UHF); Virtual: 11
- Branding: Channel 11 (11.1); MeTV Pittsburgh (11.2); Pittsburgh Cable News Channel (11.4)

Programming
- Affiliations: 11.1: NBC; for others, see § Subchannels

Ownership
- Owner: Cox Media Group; (WPXI, LLC)

History
- First air date: September 1, 1957
- Former call signs: WIIC (1957–1965); WIIC-TV (1965–1981)
- Former channel numbers: Analog: 11 (VHF, 1957–2009); Digital: 48 (UHF, 1998–2019)
- Call sign meaning: Pittsburgh XI (11 in Roman numerals)

Technical information
- Licensing authority: FCC
- Facility ID: 73910
- ERP: 500 kW
- HAAT: 306 m (1,004 ft)
- Transmitter coordinates: 40°27′47.7″N 80°0′15.5″W
- Translator(s): see § Translators

Links
- Public license information: Public file; LMS
- Website: www.wpxi.com

WPXI (channel 11) is a television station in Pittsburgh, Pennsylvania, United States, affiliated with NBC and owned by Cox Media Group. The station's offices and studios are located on Evergreen Road in the Summer Hill neighborhood of Pittsburgh. Its transmitter is on Television Hill in the Fineview section of the city, at the site of the station's original studio location.

== History ==
=== As WIIC (1957–1981) ===
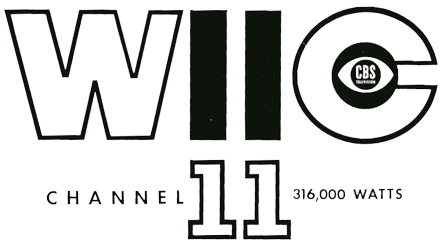
The proposed logo for WIIC-TV showing the CBS affiliation. The logo was from 1955, two years before WIIC-TV went on the air and before becoming a primary affiliate with NBC.

On September 1, 1957, Pittsburgh's second commercial VHF station signed on as WIIC. The station's construction permit was originally issued by the Federal Communications Commission (FCC) in June 1955, to WIIC Incorporated – a joint venture of the Pittsburgh Post-Gazette, which owned WWSW radio (970 AM, now WBGG), and Pittsburgh Radio Supply House, the then-owners of WJAS radio (1320 AM). Both radio stations had competed individually for the permit grant along with other applicants. CBS, which was looking to gain its own full-time affiliate in the market, signed a contract with the then-unnamed channel 11 shortly thereafter. Before the "freeze" on television station licenses, the two stations were competing for the channel 10 license originally assigned to Pittsburgh before the FCC reallocated the channels in 1952, with channel 10 going to Altoona; the Hearst Corporation (then-owners of WCAE and eventual owners of WTAE-TV) and two other companies were also applying for the channel 10 license.

Channel 11, however, did not sign on for well over two years after its permit was granted. The primary reason for the delay was on the part of WENS-TV (channel 16, now WINP-TV), whose application for the permit had been denied and later contested the FCC's original decision. In the interim, CBS continued to have most of its programs cleared by Westinghouse-owned KDKA-TV (channel 2), at the time Pittsburgh's only commercial VHF station. When CBS decided to make KDKA-TV its full-time Pittsburgh affiliate, NBC (which shared time on KDKA-TV with CBS, ABC, and station founder DuMont since its sign-on in 1949) reached a deal to affiliate with WIIC. Also, as a condition of the license grant, WJAS radio had to be sold; NBC wound up purchasing that station in August 1957. The WJAS interests later divested their 50 percent share of WIIC to another local broadcaster.

Bill Cardille signed the station on the air. In addition to Cardille, five other announcers that were with the station when it launched in 1957 include Mal Alberts, Bob Cochran, Ed Conway, Len Johnson and Mark Schaefer. Some of the first original programming to air on WIIC included Studio Wrestling and Chiller Theatre, both hosted by Cardille. Shortly after its sign-on, WIIC was briefly affiliated with the NTA Film Network, sharing the affiliation with KDKA-TV, WTAE-TV, and public television station WQED.

In 1964, WIIC was sold to Cox Enterprises; Cox subsequently traded its share in the then new cable system (today's Buckeye Broadband) in Toledo, Ohio, to the Post-Gazette's parent company Block Communications, which is based in Toledo. The station has been the longest running NBC affiliate under Cox's ownership, especially after sister stations WSOC-TV in Charlotte and WSB-TV in Atlanta switched their affiliations to ABC in 1978 and 1980, respectively. In 1970, WIIC made Pittsburgh broadcasting history when Eleanor Schano became the first woman to anchor a newscast solo. Schano also hosted a weekly 30-minute public affairs program called Face to Face.

Around 1975, Channel 11 branded itself as "e11even". Around 1977, WIIC used the "11 Alive" moniker (which had become popularized by fellow NBC affiliate WXIA-TV in Atlanta and WPIX in New York City). WIIC carried the Operation Prime Time package in 1979.

=== As WPXI (1981–present) ===
On April 20, 1981, the station's call sign was changed to WPXI (for "Pittsburgh 11", with "XI" being the Roman numeral for 11). Although the station has officially never had the "-TV" suffix since adopting the WPXI call sign, the station has on occasion been marketed as "WPXI-TV". The WIIC calls in Pittsburgh were later used by an unrelated low-power independent station that ran a music video format (that station is currently a Rev'n affiliate).

WPXI logo, 1996–2004. Former sister station WTOV-TV still uses a variation of this logo.

In 2000, Cox Enterprises purchased WTOV in Steubenville, Ohio, and WJAC-TV in Johnstown, Pennsylvania, from Sunrise Television. Those stations—which are also NBC affiliates—often appear in channel lineups for the same viewers that watch WPXI, either by over-the-air signal or via cable provider, and due to the proximity of the three stations to each other (as well as the common affiliation with NBC), were occasionally marketed together as a result. Cox changed the stations' on-air appearances to match WPXI's look, despite WPXI changing its own look in 2004. WTOV still used WPXI's former look until October 2010, and WJAC-TV adopted WPXI's current design in October 2011.

Over the Labor Day weekend of 2007, WPXI began relocating from its longtime studios at Television Hill in Pittsburgh's Fineview neighborhood after 50 years, to a new studio facility in the city's Summer Hill neighborhood near the Parkway North. The station's transmitter tower continues to be located in the Fineview neighborhood. WPXI began broadcasting its newscasts from the Summer Hill studio on October 6 beginning with the 6 p.m. newscast. In turn, it also became the first station in the Pittsburgh market to begin broadcasting its local newscasts in high definition. The station was criticized for technical glitches during the initial week of the new system run but worked through the issues and set the pace of technological advances for WTAE and KDKA to follow. With the switch to HD came a new set, created by FX Group and a new graphics package designed by Hothaus Creative.

In mid-October 2008, WPXI, in collaboration with Cox's longtime partner Internet Broadcasting, launched a redesigned website. By early November 2008, the websites of all of Cox's stations east of the Mississippi River began using the new format pioneered by WPXI; the websites of the company's stations west of the Mississippi River followed suit a month later. In 2011, Cox Media Group's partnership with Internet Broadcasting was dissolved, and the Cox television stations relaunched their website operations in-house. WPXI's and WSOC-TV's websites remained under the stewardship of Internet Broadcasting until late January 2012, when they became the last two stations to have redesigned their websites to match the format of the in-house web operations of their sister stations.

With Cox Media Group's February 23, 2013, sale of WJAC and WTOV (a sale which also included KFOX-TV in El Paso, Texas, and KRXI and KAME-TV in Reno, Nevada) to the Sinclair Broadcast Group, owners of local Fox affiliate WPGH-TV and MyNetworkTV affiliate WPMY (which was completed on May 2), WPXI became Cox's only NBC-affiliated station until 2019 when the company acquired Northwest Broadcasting stations KYMA-DT in Yuma, Arizona, KIEM-TV in Eureka, California, KPVI-DT in Pocatello, Idaho, and WNBD-LD in Grenada, Mississippi; these four stations were sold in 2022 to Imagicomm Communications, a company affiliated with the cable network INSP, at which time WPXI regained its status as the only Cox-owned NBC affiliate.

WPXI currently uses the number 11 drawn into a circle, which debuted in 1987. The "11" symbol is colored gold, while the box around it is dark blue. WPXI previously used the NBC Peacock in its logo, which was copied by sister stations WTOV and WJAC and is still used by WTOV, but revamped its own look in October 2004. WPXI's current look uses the circle 11 logo with a stylized "WPXI" below it.

On September 2, 2013, WPXI expanded its noon news to an hour, becoming Pittsburgh's first hour-long noon newscast.

=== Sale to Apollo Global Management ===
On July 24, 2018, WPXI parent Cox Enterprises announced that it was "exploring strategic options" for Cox Media Group's television stations, which the company said could involve "partnering or merging these stations into a larger TV company." Cox Media Group's president, Kim Guthrie, subsequently clarified to trade publication Radio & Television Business Report that the company was solely seeking "a merger or partnership" and not an outright sale of the television stations.

In February 2019, it was announced that Apollo Global Management would acquire Cox Media Group and Northwest Broadcasting's stations. Although the group planned to operate under the name Terrier Media, it was later announced in June 2019 that Apollo would also acquire Cox's radio and advertising businesses, and retain the Cox Media Group name. The sale was completed on December 17, 2019.

== Programming ==
=== Local programming ===
From 1963 to 1983, the station produced and broadcast Chiller Theater, a late Saturday evening horror film show hosted by Bill Cardille, or as he was referred to, "Chilly Billy". The show originally had Cardille as a solo host. In the 1970s, a cast of characters was added, and the setting was changed from a laboratory to a castle. Cardille would introduce the film being shown, as well as perform skits during breaks in the film. Cardille became well known for hosting the show and the shows themselves became part of local yore. The final program aired on January 1, 1984. Cardille remained on-air at WPXI through the early-to-mid-1990s as the weekday morning and noon weather forecaster. Cardille remained in Pittsburgh as midday personality on WJAS radio until the station format changed to talk radio in 2014; Cardille died in 2016.

The show was part of a trend during the 1960s and 1970s for television stations to produce local programming. Local stations often created their own children's shows as well. Horror theater shows, such as Shock Theatre, hosted by Ghoulardi and Big Chuck & Little John in Cleveland, as well as Chiller Theater, were not only easy to produce, but popular with the local audience.

From 1966 to 1972, WIIC had a Bandstand-type show on Saturday afternoons. Come Alive was originally sponsored by Pepsi and hosted by KQV disc jockey Chuck Brinkman. Later, WIXZ DJ Terry Lee would take over as host. The show featured teens dancing to current hit records, a weekly Top 10 countdown and appearances by local bands.

From the earliest days of the station through 1973, WIIC produced a weekly live professional wrestling show. Studio Wrestling, independent of the National Wrestling Alliance, which aired on Saturday evenings and drew strong ratings. Mal Alberts was the original host, but Cardille took over after a few years and handled the rest of the show's run. It started as a one-hour show, but was then expanded to 90 minutes because of its popularity. The show marked the earliest appearances of Bruno Sammartino, who moved to Pittsburgh from Italy as a teenager and resided in the area until his death in 2018. Studio Wrestling was run by Toots Mondt, who co-owned NWA member Capitol Wrestling Corporation (the predecessor to the present-day WWE) with Vince McMahon Sr. McMahon promptly signed Sammartino to the CWC and where Sammartino would eventually become a two-time WWWF Champion for a combined record of 11 years. WIIC/WPXI has not produced its own wrestling program since Studio Wrestling, although it has aired various WWF/WWE shows through its affiliation with NBC in the years since.

WIIC also produced a daily afternoon game show, Give It a Whirl, from 1965 to 1967. Steve Rizen of KQV radio hosted the show, which had contestants spinning a wheel to determine what prizes they could win. Local musician Dom Trimarkie was part of the show, providing material for the "Mystery Tunes" segment.

In regards to children's programming, WIIC produced Cartoon Colorama, which aired older cartoons produced in color (hence the name), hosted by Willie the Duck, a hand-puppet with a Donald Duck type of voice who spoke to off-camera announcer Don Riggs (who served as Willie's comedy foil) in between the cartoons. The show had been previously hosted by a character called "Captain Jim", who had hosted one of WIIC's best-remembered children's programs: Cap'n Jim's Popeye Club, built around Popeye cartoons. The Captain was briefly played at the beginning by the little-known Jim Saunders, and from 1959 on by Ted Eckman. The station also aired a local version of The Mickey Mouse Club during the 1960s, which was hosted by By Williams.

From 2022 to 2024, WPXI partnered with Nexstar Media Group on state governmental public affairs programming airing throughout the state, with programming airing on WPXI and (outside of Pittsburgh) on Nexstar owned or operated stations within Pennsylvania. As the Pittsburgh DMA is both the only market in Pennsylvania where Cox owns a station as well as the only market where Nexstar does not own or operate a station, the deal had no overlap between the two companies. Nexstar-produced shows now air on CBS-owned KDKA, sister station to Nexstar's WPHL Philadelphia rival, KYW-TV.

=== Sports programming ===
In 1970, when the Pittsburgh Steelers moved to the American Football Conference after the AFL-NFL merger, channel 11 became the station of record for the team (as NBC held the broadcast rights to AFC games then); this partnership continued through 1997 (after that season, CBS took over the AFC broadcast rights, and most games moved to CBS O&O KDKA-TV; channel 2 had previously served as the default home station from 1962 to 1969). Even though it aired most of the games from the Steelers' glory years of the 1970s—typically the highest-rated television programs in the market during that time—channel 11 stayed in the ratings basement. Today, Steelers games are shown on WPXI when they are featured on NBC's Sunday Night Football; in addition, the station has aired three of its Super Bowl victories (IX, XIII and XLIII) and its appearance in Super Bowl XXX. In 2022, WPXI gained the rights to air Thursday Night Football games involving the Steelers that air on Prime Video, including a Saturday night wild card playoff game in the 2024 season (the first playoff game to air exclusively on Prime Video).

WPXI also aired most Pittsburgh Pirates games that were part of NBC's Major League Baseball broadcast contract from its sign-on until 1989; this included the team's 1960 and 1971 World Series victories.

In addition, WPXI served as the secondary station for the Pittsburgh Penguins as they had carried games that were part of NBC's National Hockey League broadcast contract from the 2005–06 NHL season to the 2020–21 season; this included the team's 2009, 2016 and 2017 Stanley Cup championship victories.

== Newscasts ==
WPXI broadcasts 42 hours of locally produced newscasts each week (with 6 1/2 hours each weekday, four hours on Saturdays and 5 1/2 hours on Sundays).

Despite its early newspaper heritage with the Pittsburgh Post-Gazette (which would later partner with KDKA-TV), channel 11 struggled in the local ratings due to the dominance of KDKA-TV, which unlike channel 11 and WTAE-TV was locally owned by Westinghouse as well as channel 2's eight-year head start on the market before channel 11 signed on. WTAE-TV would become competitive with KDKA-TV during the 1970s due to an investment in its news department by owner Hearst Television, leaving WIIC-TV in a distant third place in the ratings behind KDKA-TV and WTAE-TV during much of the decade. This coincided with much of the period where NBC also struggled in the ratings. The station's ratings were so bad that Cox was unable to switch the station's affiliation to ABC like it did with sister stations WSB-TV and WSOC-TV in 1978, as Hearst Television had developed a solid affiliate relationship with ABC, thus WTAE-TV was one of its strongest affiliates and unwilling to exchange networks. It could also be argued that if not for sports coverage like the Steeler dynasty of the 1970s and the Pirates in the playoffs airing via NBC, WIIC-TV's ratings could have even been below PBS member station WQED (during the peak era of locally recorded Mister Rogers' Neighborhood) and lowly independent WPGH-TV, years before Fox's existence.

Following the change in callsigns to WPXI in 1981, Cox began to follow WTAE-TV's lead and invest heavily in its news department. Upon adopting its current logo in 1987, WPXI started using the famous "Move Closer to Your World" theme by Al Ham that was popularized by ABC O&O WPVI-TV in Philadelphia, even adopting that station's fast-paced video montage (but not the Action News branding, due to it being used by WTAE-TV), eventually commissioning a modernized version of the theme used during the 1990s. The changes, combined with Westinghouse absorbing CBS and standardizing KDKA-TV along the lines of its new CBS O&O sister stations (and subsequent less emphasis on local programming), finally saw WPXI reach parity with KDKA-TV and WTAE-TV during the 1990s. Nowadays in addition to being in a dead heat for number one in local news ratings, WPXI is currently one of NBC's strongest major-market affiliates overcoming any lags due to the station's delays in signing on in its early years and despite the fluctuating strength of network programming. Over the past decade, Pittsburgh has been a perennially competitive market for local news, with news ratings usually differing by less than a full ratings point.

WPXI was the first station to offer a 5:30 p.m. newscast in Pittsburgh from 1981 to 1984 (titled 5:30 Live); it was then revived in 1987 with the name Channel 11 News First Edition. It was also the first station to offer a 5 p.m. newscast in the early 1990s, titled Channel 11 News First at 5. WPXI dropped NBC's Saturday morning cartoons in September 1990 in favor of a running a newscast airing from 8 a.m. to 12:30 p.m. The success of the weekend morning newscast prompted NBC network officials to extend the Today show to weekends. WPXI, however, has since scaled back the length of its weekend morning newscasts. Pittsburgh native Jodi Applegate co-anchored NBC's Weekend Today, but was never seen locally due to WPXI's weekend morning newscasts. WPXI added Weekend Today in September 2012. In September 2021, WPXI added a 4 p.m. newscast.

On January 12, 2006, Sinclair Broadcast Group (owner of Fox affiliate WPGH-TV) and WPXI entered into a news share agreement allowing channel 11 to take over production of WPGH's 10 p.m. newscast. WPXI began producing a 10 p.m. newscast for that station (titled Channel 11 News on Fox 53 at Ten) on January 30, 2006, two weeks after WPGH shut down its in-house news department due to corporate cutbacks made by Sinclair at its news-producing stations. All of WPGH's news staff, except for sportscaster Alby Oxenreiter, were laid off. The program runs for 45 minutes on Sunday through Friday nights, and for 30 minutes on Saturdays; a sports highlight show titled Ox on Fox Sports Extra (hosted by Oxenreiter) fills the remaining 15 minutes of the newscast Sunday through Fridays. On October 6, 2007, WPXI began broadcasting in high definition, and Channel 11 News on Fox 53 was included in the upgrade. WPXI also produces a 6:30 p.m. newscast for WPGH, which launched on March 14, 2022. On January 8, 2024, Channel 11 Morning News on Fox 53 debuted at 7 a.m. as an extension of WPXI's existing morning newscast.

Since dropping "Move Closer to Your World" in the late 1990s, WPXI is known to commission its own theme music from various composers. It has commissioned "Total Coverage" (its previous package), and after WPXI moved to its new Summer Hill television building, it started using "The Tower V.2", ending the "NBC Collection" altogether. WPXI dropped "The Tower V.2" in 2014 and replaced it with a new special news theme, which lasted until January 2024.

=== Pittsburgh Cable News Channel ===
The station went into cable television on January 1, 1994, with the launch of the Pittsburgh Cable News Channel (PCNC). PCNC produced the first 10 p.m. newscast in the Pittsburgh market. The final installment of PCNC's 10 p.m. newscast aired on January 26, 2006, as WPXI took over production of WPGH-TV's 10 p.m. newscast. Comcast (Xfinity) announced in early 2020 that it would drop PCNC from its line up, greatly reducing the viewing audience. WPXI added PCNC to its digital subchannel lineup in early March 2023.

=== Ratings ===
Pittsburgh is one of the most competitive markets in the country for local news and viewers benefit by getting quality newscasts from three strong stations. As of May 2025, WPXI has the most watched newscast in the age 25-54 demo at 5 and 6 a.m., 4, 5, and 6 p.m., 10 p.m. on WPGH, and 11 p.m. From 1997 to 1999, WPXI led #1 ahead of WTAE-TV and KDKA-TV in viewership for the 5 p.m. newscast due to lead-in by early fringe talk show, The Jerry Springer Show at 4 p.m. As of May 2010, WPXI has a strong lead with viewers in the 5–6 a.m. and 10 p.m. timeslots. However, WPXI had the least-watched newscasts in Pittsburgh at noon, 4, 5, 6, and 11 p.m. (with KDKA-TV being the highest watched during those timeslots, except for WTAE-TV which was the leader at 11 p.m. as of the February 2013 ratings period).

=== Notable current on-air staff ===
- Lisa Sylvester – anchor

=== Notable former on-air staff ===
- Asa Aarons – consumer reporter (1984–1990)
- Kevin Benson (AMS Certified Broadcast Meteorologist Seal of Approval) – meteorologist (1987–2019)
- Rocky Bleier – sports anchor (1981–1985)
- Julie Bologna – chief meteorologist (1999–2004 and 2008–2011)
- Bill Cardille – on-air announcer (1957–2000; was the first personality on air at WIIC)
- Beano Cook – commentator (late 1980s)
- Red Donley – sports anchor (1961–1970)
- John Fedko – sports director (1987–2010)
- Pat Finn – weather forecaster/reporter (1979–1983)
- Mark Malone – sports anchor (1990–1993)
- Todd McDermott – morning and noon co-anchor (2010–2012)
- Sam Nover – sports anchor (1970–2001)
- Edye Tarbox – anchor (1987–1989)

== Technical information ==
=== Subchannels ===
The station's signal is multiplexed:

Subchannels of WPXI
Subchannel	Res.	Short name	Programming
11.1	1080i	WPXI-HD	NBC
11.2	480i	MeTV	MeTV
11.3	480i	LAFF TV	Laff
11.4	480i	PCNC	PCNC

WPXI was the first station in Pittsburgh to make use of additional programming on its digital channels. On June 21, 2007, WPXI began carrying programming from NBC Weather Plus on digital subchannel 11.2. The service, branded as WPXI 11 Weather Plus, offered local and national weather information 24 hours a day. Locally, WPXI's Scott Harbaugh served as the main meteorologist on the station's Weather Plus service.

WPXI added an airwave digital channel on 11.3 on October 15, 2007, when it began an affiliation with Retro Television Network. Sister stations WJAC-TV and WTOV-TV also began offering RTV programming on their subchannels. Following the shutdown of NBC Weather Plus in December 2008, WPXI moved RTV to 11.2 while the 11.3 subchannel went dark. On June 13, 2011, WPXI replaced RTV with competing classic television network Me-TV.

While all three Pittsburgh news stations air news video on its websites with WTAE even airing full newscasts on its website, WPXI was the first station in the Pittsburgh market to have over-the-top content available on a streaming service, having its own dedicated channel on Roku since 2014. If someone within the WPXI viewing area orders a Roku Player, the WPXI News app is automatically installed on the player. The WPXI-Roku partnership is part of a larger partnership between Roku and Cox-owned stations. WPXI was the only station in Pittsburgh with such a service until KDKA-TV launched CBSN Pittsburgh as part of CBS News on March 5, 2020.

On April 15, 2015, WPXI became a charter affiliate of Laff on channel 11.3, bringing 11.3 live again for the first time since NBC Weather Plus shut down.

=== Analog-to-digital conversion ===
WPXI shut down its analog signal, over VHF channel 11, on June 12, 2009, the official date on which full-power television stations in the United States transitioned from analog to digital broadcasts under federal mandate. The station's digital signal continued to broadcast on its pre-transition UHF channel 48. One of the station's last programs it aired on its analog signal was Game 7 of the 2009 Stanley Cup Finals, which saw the Pittsburgh Penguins clinch their third Stanley Cup less than an hour and a half before WPXI shut down its analog signal. WPKD-TV currently operates its digital signal on WPXI's former analog position.

=== Translators ===
- WPXI (DRT) 34 New Castle
- WPXI (DRT) 24 Uniontown

In July 2009, the station applied with the FCC to operate three repeater signals: channel 21 in Derry Township (which was not used and the permit has expired), channel 23 in Uniontown, and channel 33 in New Castle. The signal in Derry Township was expected to cover all of Westmoreland County, while the Uniontown signal could penetrate into the Pittsburgh suburb of McKeesport. The New Castle signal partially goes into Youngstown, Ohio (to which New Castle is much closer despite being part of the Pittsburgh DMA), and serves as a secondary NBC affiliate for the Youngstown television market, which is primarily served by WFMJ-TV (and in some parts with Cleveland NBC affiliate WKYC), while giving the Youngstown market an outlet for MeTV and a secondary outlet for Laff alongside that market's primary affiliate WYFX-LD. Digital television receivers display the virtual channels of its main signal and its three repeaters as its former VHF analog channel 11.
