= Edwin Stanton =

American lawyer and politician (1814–1869)

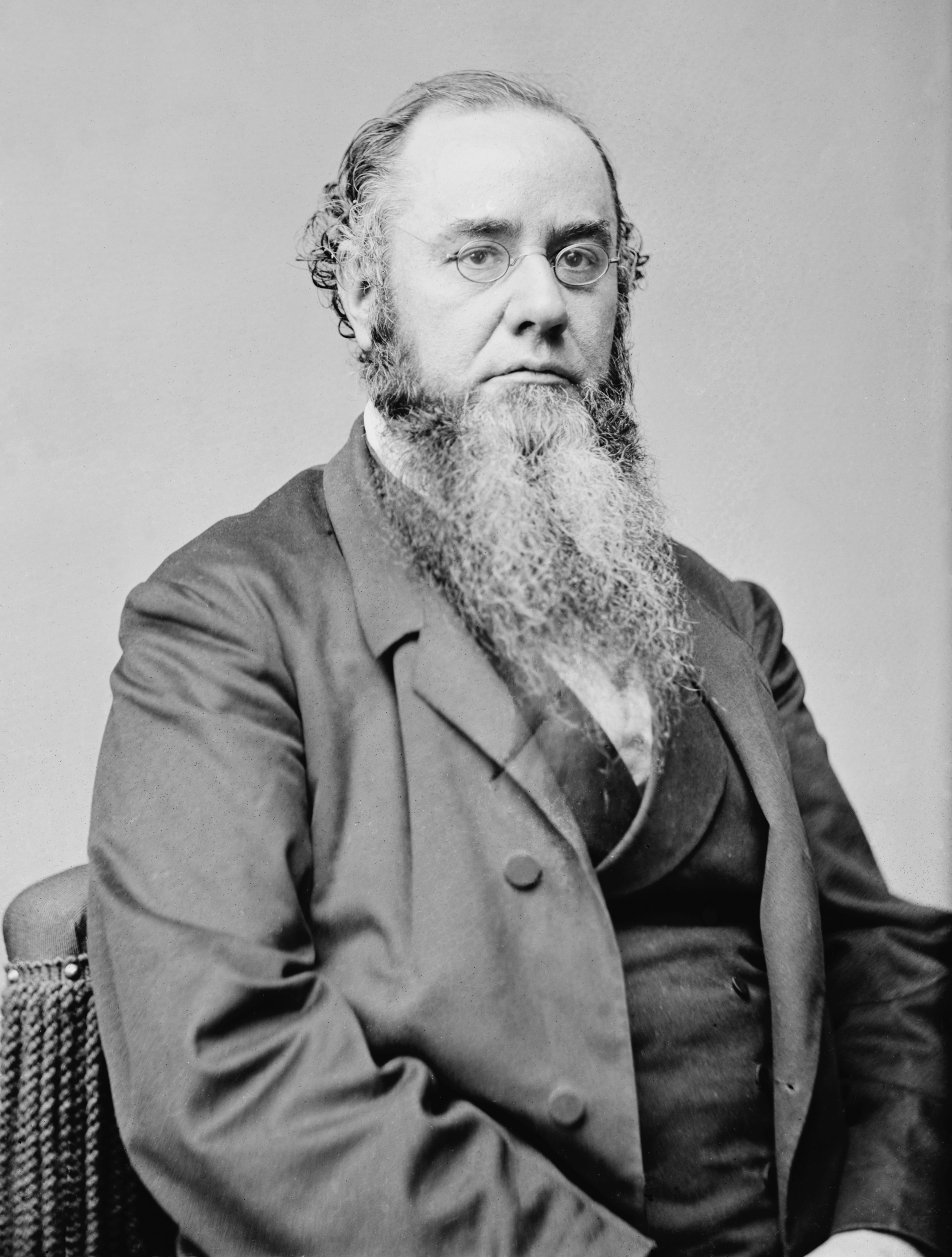
- Photograph c. 1866–1869

27th United States Secretary of War
- In office January 20, 1862 – May 28, 1868; Suspended: August 12, 1867 to January 14, 1868 (Note: Ulysses S. Grant served as acting Secretary of War.)
- President: Abraham Lincoln; Andrew Johnson
- Preceded by: Simon Cameron
- Succeeded by: John Schofield

General in Chief of the Armies of the United States
- In office March 11, 1862 – July 23, 1862
- President: Abraham Lincoln
- Preceded by: George B. McClellan
- Succeeded by: Henry Halleck

25th United States Attorney General
- In office December 20, 1860 – March 4, 1861
- President: James Buchanan
- Preceded by: Jeremiah Black
- Succeeded by: Edward Bates

Personal details
- Born: Edwin McMasters Stanton; December 19, 1814 Steubenville, Ohio, U.S.
- Died: December 24, 1869 (aged 55) Washington, D.C., U.S.
- Resting place: Oak Hill Cemetery, Washington, D.C., U.S.
- Party: Democratic (before 1862); Republican (1862–1869)
- Spouses: Mary Lamson (m. 1836; died 1844) Ellen Hutchison (m. 1856)
- Children: 6, including Edwin L. Stanton
- Parents: David Stanton; Lucy Norman
- Education: Kenyon College

Edwin McMasters Stanton (December 19, 1814 – December 24, 1869) was an American lawyer and politician who was the 27th United States secretary of war. Serving under President Abraham Lincoln during most of the American Civil War, Stanton remained as the secretary of war under President Andrew Johnson during the first years of the Reconstruction Era.

Stanton was a prominent attorney in eastern Ohio and Pittsburgh before serving as the United States attorney general in the final months of President James Buchanan's term. His management of the war department during the Civil War helped organize the massive military resources of the North and guide the Union to victory. However, he was criticized by many Union generals, who perceived Stanton as overcautious and a micromanager. After the assassination of Abraham Lincoln, Stanton organized the manhunt for Lincoln's assassin, John Wilkes Booth.

Stanton opposed the lenient policies of Johnson towards the former Confederate States, resulting in Johnson suspending Stanton in 1867. The Radical Republicans reinstated Stanton the following year and the attempt ultimately led to the impeachment of Andrew Johnson in the House of Representatives. Stanton returned to practicing law after he retired as secretary, and in 1869, he was nominated as an associate justice of the Supreme Court by Johnson's successor, Ulysses S. Grant. He died four days after his nomination was confirmed by the Senate and remains the only confirmed nominee to accept but die before serving on the Court.

== Family and early life ==
=== Ancestry ===
Before the American Revolution, Stanton's paternal ancestors, the Stantons and the Macys, both of whom were Quakers, moved from Massachusetts to North Carolina. In 1774, Stanton's grandfather, Benjamin Stanton, married Abigail Macy. Benjamin died in 1800. That same year, Abigail moved to the Northwest Territory, accompanied by much of her family. Soon, Ohio was admitted to the Union, and Macy proved to be one of the early developers of the new state. She bought a tract of land at Mount Pleasant, Ohio, from the government and settled there. One of her sons, David, became a physician in Steubenville, and married Lucy Norman, the daughter of a Virginia planter. Their marriage was met with the ire of Ohio's Quaker community, as Lucy was a Methodist, and not a Quaker. This forced David Stanton to abandon the Quaker sect.

=== Early life and education ===
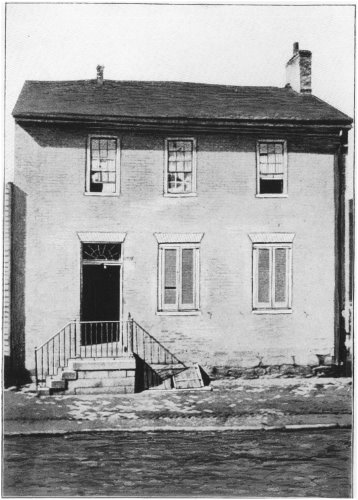
Stanton's birthplace in Steubenville, Ohio

Edwin McMasters was born to David and Lucy Stanton on December 19, 1814, in Steubenville, Ohio, the first of their four children. His early formal education consisted of a private school and a seminary behind the Stanton residence, known as "Old Academy". At age 10, he was transferred to a school taught by a Presbyterian minister. Stanton later experienced his first asthma attack, a malady that haunted him for life, sometimes to the point of convulsion. Because of his asthma, Stanton was unable to participate in highly physical activities, so he found interest in books and poetry. Stanton regularly attended Methodist church services and Sunday school. At age 13, Stanton became a full member of the Methodist church.

David Stanton's medical practice afforded him and his family a decent living. When David Stanton suddenly died in December 1827 at his residence, the Stanton family was left destitute. Stanton's mother opened a store in the front room of their residence, selling the medical supplies her husband left her, along with books, stationery and groceries. The young Stanton was removed from school and worked at the store of a local bookseller.

Stanton began his college studies at the Episcopal Church-affiliated Kenyon College in 1831. At Kenyon, Stanton was involved in the college's Philomathesian Literary Society. He sat on several of the society's committees and was often a participant in its exercises and debates. Stanton was forced to leave Kenyon just at the end of his third semester for lack of finances. At Kenyon, Stanton's support of President Andrew Jackson's actions during the 1832 nullification crisis, a hotly debated topic among the Philomathesians, led him into the Democratic Party. Furthermore, Stanton's conversion to Episcopalianism and his revulsion of the practice of slavery were solidified there. After Kenyon, Stanton worked as a bookseller in Columbus. He had hoped to obtain enough money to complete his final year at Kenyon, but a small salary at the bookstore dashed the notion. Stanton soon returned to Steubenville to pursue studies in law.

=== Early career and first marriage ===
Stanton studied law under the tutelage of Daniel Collier in preparation for the bar. He was admitted to practice in 1835 and began work at a prominent law firm in Cadiz, Ohio, under Chauncey Dewey, a well-known attorney. The firm's trial work often fell to Stanton .

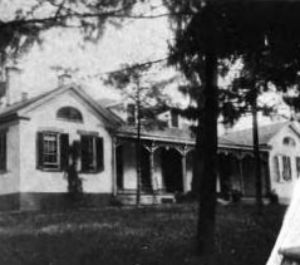
Stanton's home in Cadiz, Ohio

At age 18, Stanton met Mary Ann Lamson at Trinity Episcopal Church in Columbus, and they soon were engaged. After buying a home in Cadiz, Stanton went to Columbus, where his betrothed was. Stanton and Lamson had wished to be married at Trinity Episcopal, but his illness rendered this idea moot. Instead, the ceremony was performed at the home of Trinity Episcopal's rector on December 31, 1836. Afterwards, Stanton went to Virginia, where his mother and sisters were, and escorted the women back to Cadiz, where they would live with Stanton and his wife.

After his marriage, Stanton partnered with the lawyer and federal judge Benjamin Tappan. His sister also married Tappan's son. In Cadiz, Stanton was situated prominently in the local community. He worked with the town's anti-slavery society, and with a local newspaper, the Sentinel, writing and editing articles there. In 1837, Stanton was elected the prosecutor of Harrison County, on the Democratic ticket. Further, Stanton's increasing wealth allowed him to purchase a large tract of land in Washington County, and several tracts in Cadiz.

== Rising attorney (1839–1860) ==
=== Return to Steubenville ===
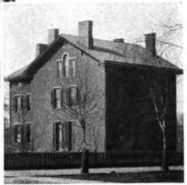
Stanton's home on Third Street in Steubenville

Stanton's relationship with Benjamin Tappan expanded when Tappan was elected the United States senator from Ohio in 1838. Tappan asked Stanton to oversee his law operations, which were based in Steubenville. When his time as county prosecutor was finished, Stanton moved back to the town. Stanton's work in politics also expanded. He served as a delegate at the Democrats' 1840 national convention in Baltimore, and was featured prominently in Martin Van Buren's campaign in the 1840 presidential election, which Van Buren lost.

Stanton was a member of Steubenville Freemasons Lodge No. 45 in Steubenville, Ohio. When he moved to Pittsburgh, Stanton became a member of Washington Lodge No. 253 on 25 March 1852 as a charter member. He resigned on 29 Nov. 1859.

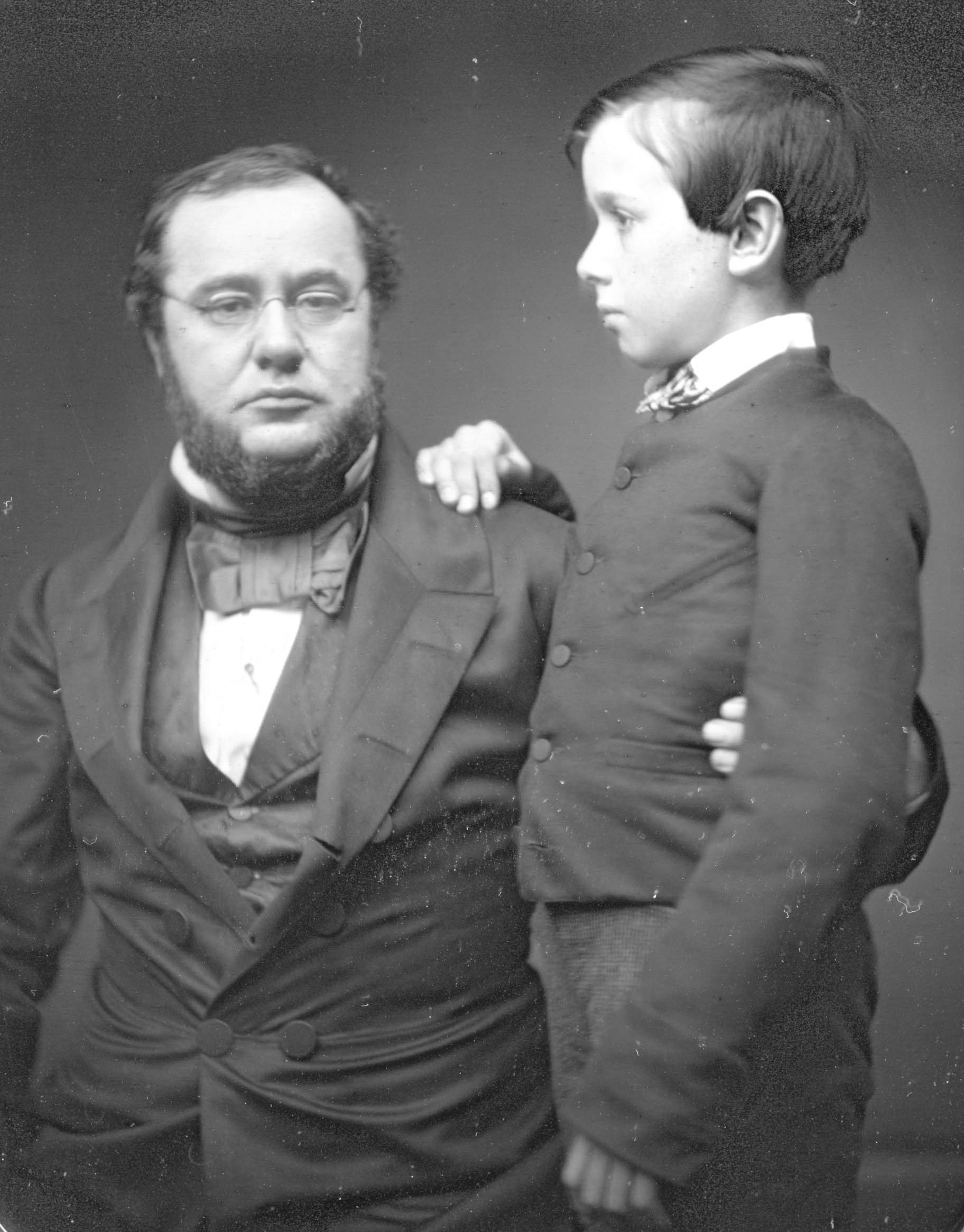
Stanton with his son Edwin Lamson c. 1852–1855

In Steubenville, the Stantons welcomed two children. Their daughter, Lucy Lamson, was born in March 1840. Within months of her birth, Lucy was stricken with an unknown illness. Stanton put aside his work to spend that summer at baby Lucy's bedside. She died in 1841. Their son, Edwin Lamson Stanton, was born in August 1842. The boy's birth refreshed the spirits in the Stanton household after Lucy's death. Unlike Lucy's early years, Edwin was healthy and active. However, grief would return once again to the Stanton household when Mary Stanton was left bedridden by a bilious fever. Never recovering, she died in March 1844. Stanton's sorrow "verged on insanity", say historians Benjamin P. Thomas and Harold M. Hyman. He had Mary's burial attire redone repeatedly, as Stanton demanded she look just as she had when they were wed seven years prior. In the evenings, Stanton would emerge from his room with his eyes filled with tears and frantically search the house with a lamp, all the while asking, "Where is Mary?"

Stanton regrouped and began to focus on his cases by the summer. One such case was defending Caleb J. McNulty, whom Stanton had previously labelled "a glorious fellow". McNulty, a Democrat, was dismissed from his clerkship of the United States House of Representatives by unanimous vote and charged with embezzlement when thousands of the House's money went missing. Democrats, fearing their party's disrepute, made clamorous cries for McNulty to be punished, and his conviction was viewed as a foregone conclusion. Stanton, at Tappan's request, came on as McNulty's defense. Stanton brought a motion to dismiss McNulty's indictment. He employed the use of numerous technicalities and, to the shock and applause of the courtroom, the motion was granted, with all charges against McNulty dropped. As every detail of the affair was covered by newspapers around the country, Stanton's name was featured prominently nationwide.

After the McNulty scandal, Stanton and Tappan parted ways professionally. Stanton formed a partnership with one of his former students, George Wythe McCook of the "Fighting McCooks". At the beginning of the Mexican–American War, men across the country hastened to enlist in the United States Army, with McCook among them. Stanton might have enlisted as well, if not for his doctor's fears about his asthma. Instead, Stanton focused on law. His practice was no longer only in Ohio, having expanded to Virginia and Pennsylvania. Stanton concluded that Steubenville would no longer prove adequate as a headquarters and thought Pittsburgh most appropriate for his new base. Stanton was admitted to the bar there by late 1847.

=== Attorney in Pittsburgh ===
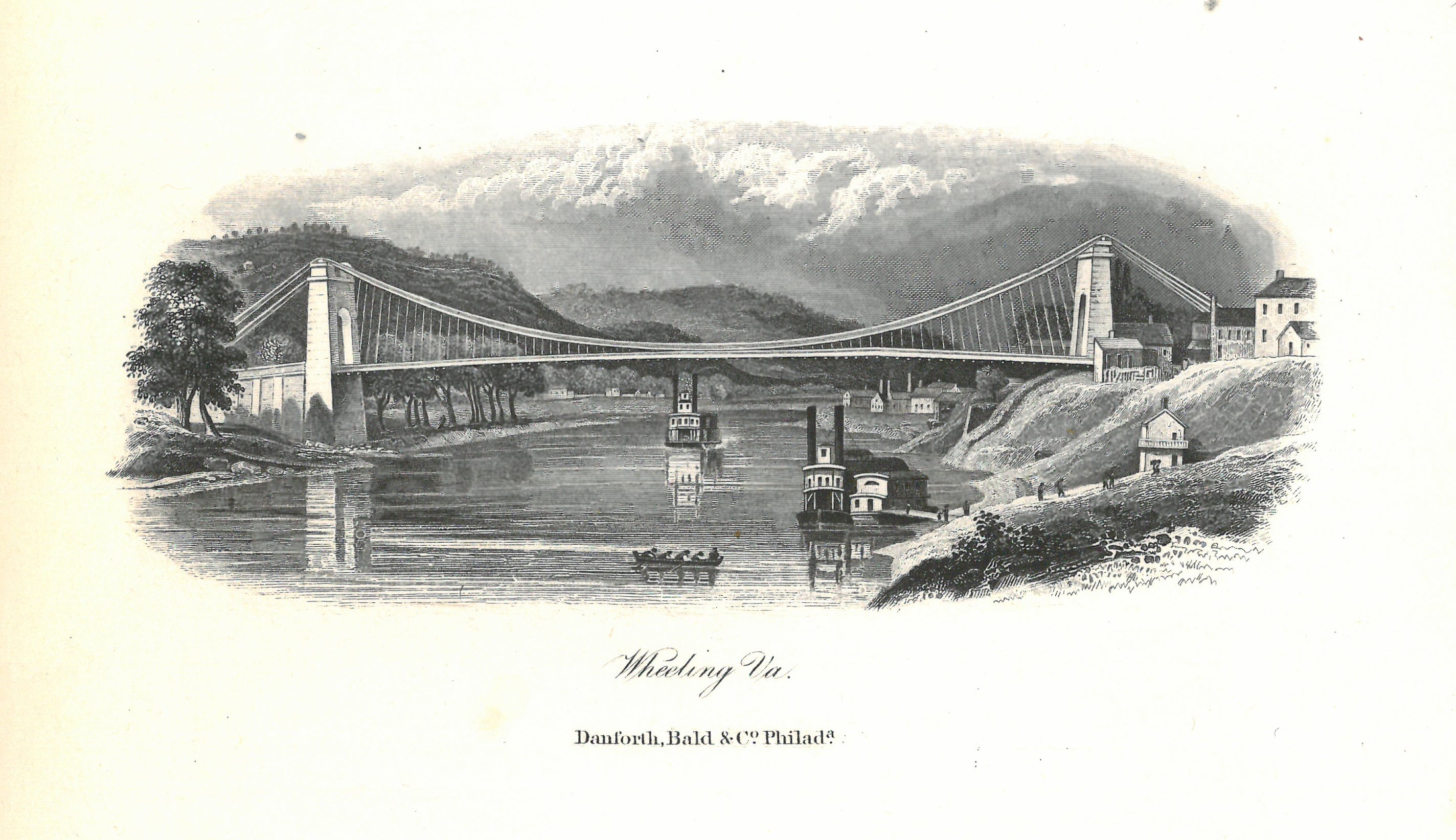
A lithograph of the Wheeling Suspension Bridge

In Pittsburgh, Stanton formed a partnership with a prominent retired judge, Charles Shaler, while maintaining his collaboration with McCook, who had remained in Steubenville after returning from service in the Mexican–American War. Stanton argued several high-profile suits. One such proceeding was State of Pennsylvania v. Wheeling and Belmont Bridge Company and others in the United States Supreme Court. The case concerned the Wheeling Suspension Bridge, the largest suspension bridge in the world at that time, and an important connector for the National Road. The bridge's center rose some 90 feet (27 m), but proved to be a nuisance to passing ships with tall smokestacks. With ships unable to clear the bridge, enormous amounts of traffic, trade and commerce would be redirected to Wheeling, West Virginia, which at the time was still part of Virginia. On August 16, 1849, Stanton urged the Supreme Court to enjoin Wheeling and Belmont, as the bridge was obstructing traffic into Pennsylvania and hindering trade and commerce. Associate Justice R. C. Grier directed those who were aggrieved by the bridge's operations to go to a lower court, but left an avenue open for Stanton to file for an injunction in the Supreme Court, which he did. (Note: In his preparations for the case, Stanton was questioning sailors at Pittsburgh's docks when he fell into the hold of the cargo vessel Isaac Newton. The result was a limp in his gait that would keep with him for the rest of his life.)

Oral arguments for the Pennsylvania v. Wheeling and Belmont began on February 25, 1850, which was also when Stanton was admitted to practice in the Supreme Court. Wheeling and Belmont argued that the court lacked jurisdiction over the matters concerning the case; the justices disagreed. The case proceeded, allowing Stanton to exhibit a dramatic stunt, which was widely reported on and demonstrated how the bridge was a hindrance—he had the steamer Hibernia ram its 85 feet (26 m) smokestack into the bridge, which destroyed it and a piece of the ship itself. May 1850 saw the case handed over to Reuben H. Walworth, the former chancellor of New York, who returned a vivid opinion in February 1851 stating that the Wheeling Bridge was "an unwarranted and unlawful obstruction to navigation, and that it must be either removed or raised so as to permit the free and usual passage of boats." The Supreme Court concurred; in May 1852, the court ordered in a 7–2 ruling that the bridge's height be increased to one hundred eleven feet (thirty-four meters). Wheeling and Belmont were unsatisfied with the ruling and asked Congress to act. To Stanton's horror, a bill declaring the Wheeling bridge permissible became law on August 31, effectively overriding the Supreme Court's ruling and authority. Stanton was disgruntled that the purpose of the court—to peacefully decide and remedy disputes between states—had been diminished by Congress.

=== McCormick v. Manny ===
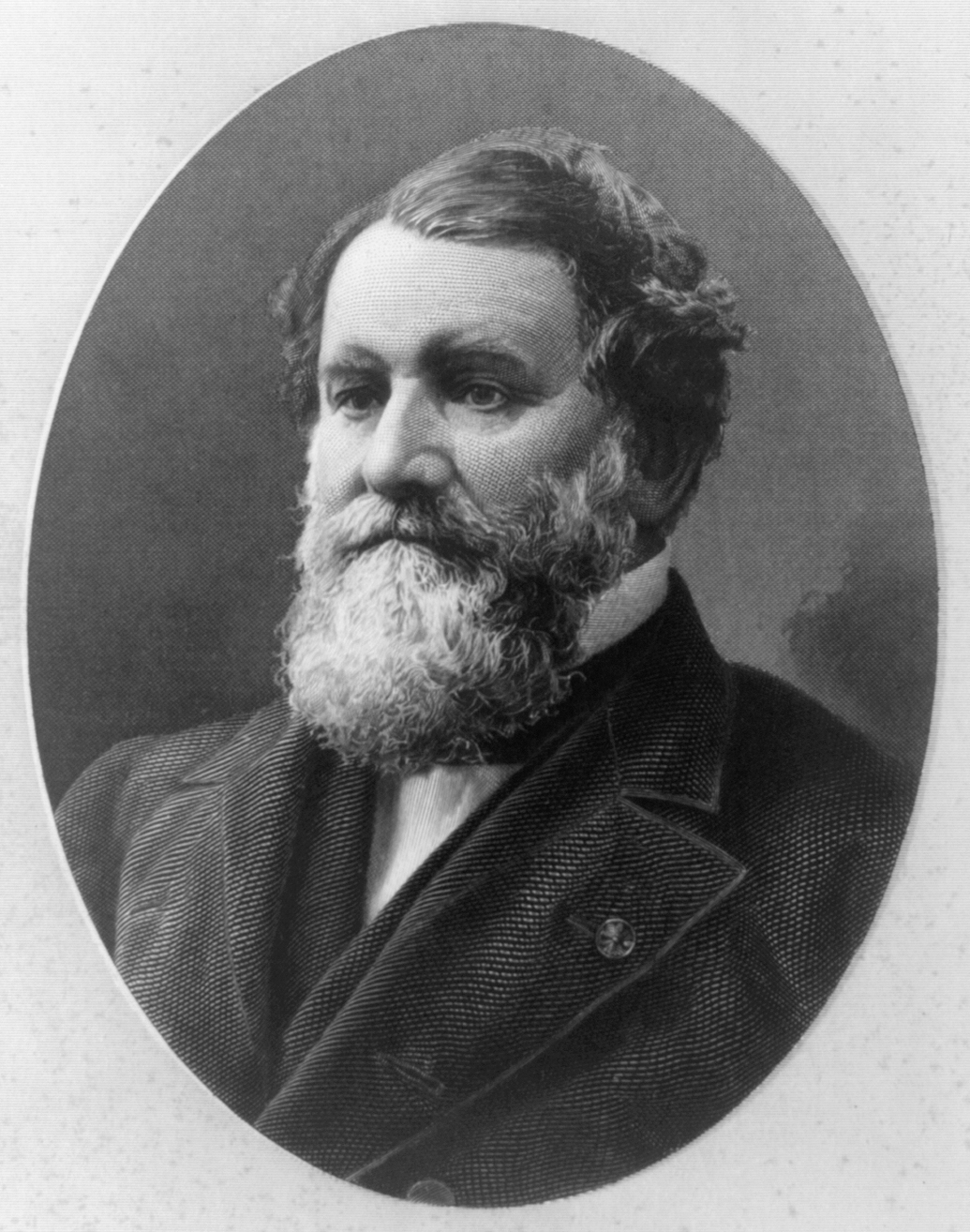
An engraving of Cyrus McCormick

A by-effect of Stanton's performance in Pennsylvania v. Wheeling and Belmont was that he was sought after for other prominent cases, such as the McCormick Reaper patent case of inventor Cyrus McCormick. In 1831, a young McCormick created a machine to harvest crops. The device was particularly useful in the burgeoning wheat fields of the Western United States. Demand for McCormick's invention grew rapidly, attracting fierce competition, especially from fellow inventor and businessman John Henry Manny. In 1854, McCormick and his two prominent lawyers, Reverdy Johnson and Edward M. Dickinson, filed suit against Manny claiming he had infringed on McCormick's patents. McCormick demanded an injunction on Manny's reaper. Manny was also defended by two esteemed lawyers, George Harding and Peter H. Watson. McCormick v. Manny was initially to be tried in Chicago, and the two lawyers wanted another attorney local to the city to join their team; the recommended choice was Abraham Lincoln. When Watson met Lincoln in Springfield, Illinois, he had a dim first impression of him, but after speaking with Lincoln, Watson saw that he might be a good choice. However, when the venue of the proceedings was transferred to Cincinnati rather than Chicago, and the necessity for Lincoln was negated, Harding and Watson went for their first choice, Edwin Stanton. Lincoln was not made aware that he had been replaced, and still appeared at the proceedings in Cincinnati with his arguments prepared. Stanton's apprehension towards Lincoln was immediate and severe, and he did well to indicate to Lincoln that he wanted him to absent himself from the case. The case proceeded with Harding, Watson and Stanton and Manny's true defenders; Lincoln did not actively participate in the planning or arguing of the case, but stayed in Cincinnati as a spectator.

Stanton's role in Manny's legal trio was as a researcher. Though he admitted that George Harding, an established patent lawyer, was more adept at the scientific aspects of the case, Stanton worked to summarize the relevant jurisprudence and case law. To win McCormick v. Manny for Manny, Stanton, Harding and Watson had to impress upon the court that McCormick had no claim to exclusivity in his reaper's use of a divider, a mechanism on the outer end of the cutter-bar which separated the grain. A harvesting machine would not have worked properly without a divider, and Manny's defense knew this. However, to assure a win, Watson opted to use duplicity—he employed a model maker named William P. Wood to retrieve an older version of McCormick's reaper and alter it to be presented in court. Wood found a reaper in Virginia, which was built in 1844, one year prior to McCormick's patent being granted. He had a blacksmith straighten the curved divider, knowing that the curved divider in Manny's reaper would not conflict with a straight one in McCormick's reaper. After using a salt and vinegar solution to add rust to where the blacksmith had worked to ensure the antiquity of the machine was undeniable, Wood sent the reaper to Cincinnati. Stanton was overjoyed when he examined the altered reaper and knew the case was theirs. Arguments for the case began in September 1855. In March 1856, Justices John McLean and Thomas Drummond delivered a ruling in favor of John Manny. McCormick appealed the decision to the Supreme Court, and McCormick v. Manny, was, all of a sudden, a political issue, and the matters concerning the case found their way to the floor of Congress. Stanton would later appoint Wood to be superintendent of the military prisons of the District of Columbia during the Civil War.

=== Second marriage ===
In February 1856, Stanton became engaged to Ellen Hutchinson, 16 years Stanton's junior. She came from a prominent family in the city; her father was Lewis Hutchinson, a wealthy merchant and warehouseman and a descendant of Meriwether Lewis. They were married on June 25, 1856, at Hutchinson's father's home. Stanton moved to Washington, where Stanton expected important work with the Supreme Court.

=== Emergence in Washington ===
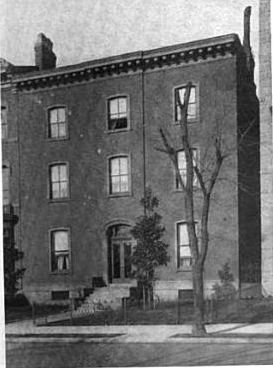
Stanton's home in Washington, D.C.

In Pennsylvania, Stanton had become intimately acquainted with Jeremiah S. Black, the chief judge in the state's supreme court. This friendship proved profitable for Stanton when, in March 1857, the recently inaugurated fifteenth president, James Buchanan, made Black his attorney general. Black's accession to his new post was soon met with a land claims issue in California. In the Treaty of Guadalupe Hidalgo that ended the Mexican–American War and gave California to the United States, the United States agreed to recognize valid land grants by Mexican authorities. This was followed by the California Land Claims Act of 1851, which established a board to review claims to California lands. One such claim was made by Joseph Yves Limantour, a French-born merchant who asserted ownership of an assemblage of lands that included important sections of the state, such as a sizeable part of San Francisco. When his claims were recognized by the land commissioners, the U.S. government appealed. Meanwhile, Black corresponded with a person named Auguste Jouan, who stated that Limantour's claims were invalid and that he, under Limantour's employ, forged the date listed on one of the approved grants. Black needed an individual loyal to the Democratic Party and to the Buchanan administration, who could faithfully represent the administration's interests in California; he chose Stanton.

Ellen Stanton loathed the idea. In California, Edwin would be thousands of miles away from her for what was sure to be months, leaving her lonely in Washington, where she had few friends. Moreover, on May 9, 1857, Ellen had a daughter whom the Stantons named Eleanor Adams. After the girl's delivery, Ellen fell ill, which frightened Edwin and delayed his decision to go to California. In October 1857, Stanton finally agreed to represent the Buchanan administration's interests in California. Having agreed to a compensation of $25,000, (~$722,982 in 2025) Stanton set sail from New York City on February 19, 1858, aboard the Star of the West, along with his son Eddie, James Buchanan III, the president's nephew, and Lieutenant H. N. Harrison, who was assigned to Stanton's detail by the Navy. After a tempestuous voyage, the company docked in Kingston, Jamaica, where slavery was disallowed. On the island, the climate pleased Stanton greatly, and at a church there, Stanton was surprised to see blacks and whites sitting together. Afterwards, Stanton and his entourage landed in Panama and left there on a ship three times larger than the one on which they came, the Sonora. On March 19, the company finally docked in San Francisco and bunkered at the International Hotel.

Stanton took to his work with haste. In aid of his case, Stanton, along with his entire party and two clerks, went about arranging disordered records from California's time under Mexico. The "Jemino Index" that he uncovered gave information on land grants up to 1844, and with the assistance of a Congressional act, Stanton unearthed records from all over the state pertaining to Mexican grants. Stanton and company worked for months sorting the land archives; meanwhile, Stanton's arrival in California produced gossip and scorn from locals, especially from those whose land claims would be in jeopardy should Stanton's work prove victorious. Further, President Buchanan and Senator Douglas were wrestling for control of California, and Stanton was caught in the crosshairs, resulting in a defamatory campaign against Stanton by Douglas' supporters. The campaign disheartened Stanton, but barely distracted him.

Limantour had built up a speciously substantial case. He had accrued a preponderance of ostensibly sound evidence, such as witness testimony, grants signed by Manuel Micheltorena, the Mexican governor of California prior to cessation, and paper with a special Mexican government stamp. However, Auguste Jouan's information was instrumental in Stanton's case. According to Jouan, Limantour had received dozens of blank documents signed by Governor Micheltorena, which Limantour could fill in as he willed. Further, Jouan had bored a hole in one of the papers to erase something, a hole that was still present in the document. Stanton also acquired letters that explicitly laid out the fraud, and stamps used by customs officials, one authentic and the other fraudulent. The fraudulent one had been used eleven times, all on Limantour's documents. When Stanton sent to the Minister of the Exterior in Mexico City, they could not locate records corroborating Limantour's grants. In late 1858, the land commission denied Limantour's claims, and he was arrested on perjury charges. He posted a $35,000 bail and left the country.

As 1858 drew to a close, and Stanton prepared to return home, Eddie became sick. Whenever Stanton made arrangements to leave California, his son's condition grew worse. Edwin had written Ellen as often as he could as her anxiety and loneliness increased in Washington. She criticized him for leaving her in the town alone with young "Ellie". January 3, 1859, saw Stanton and company leave San Francisco. He was home in early February. In the nation's capital, Stanton advised President Buchanan on patronage, and helped Attorney General Black extensively, even being mistaken for an Assistant Attorney General. Nonetheless, Stanton's affairs in Washington paled in comparison to the excitement he had experienced on the other side of the country—at least until he found himself defending a man who had become fodder for sensationalists and gossipers around the country.

=== Daniel Sickles trial ===
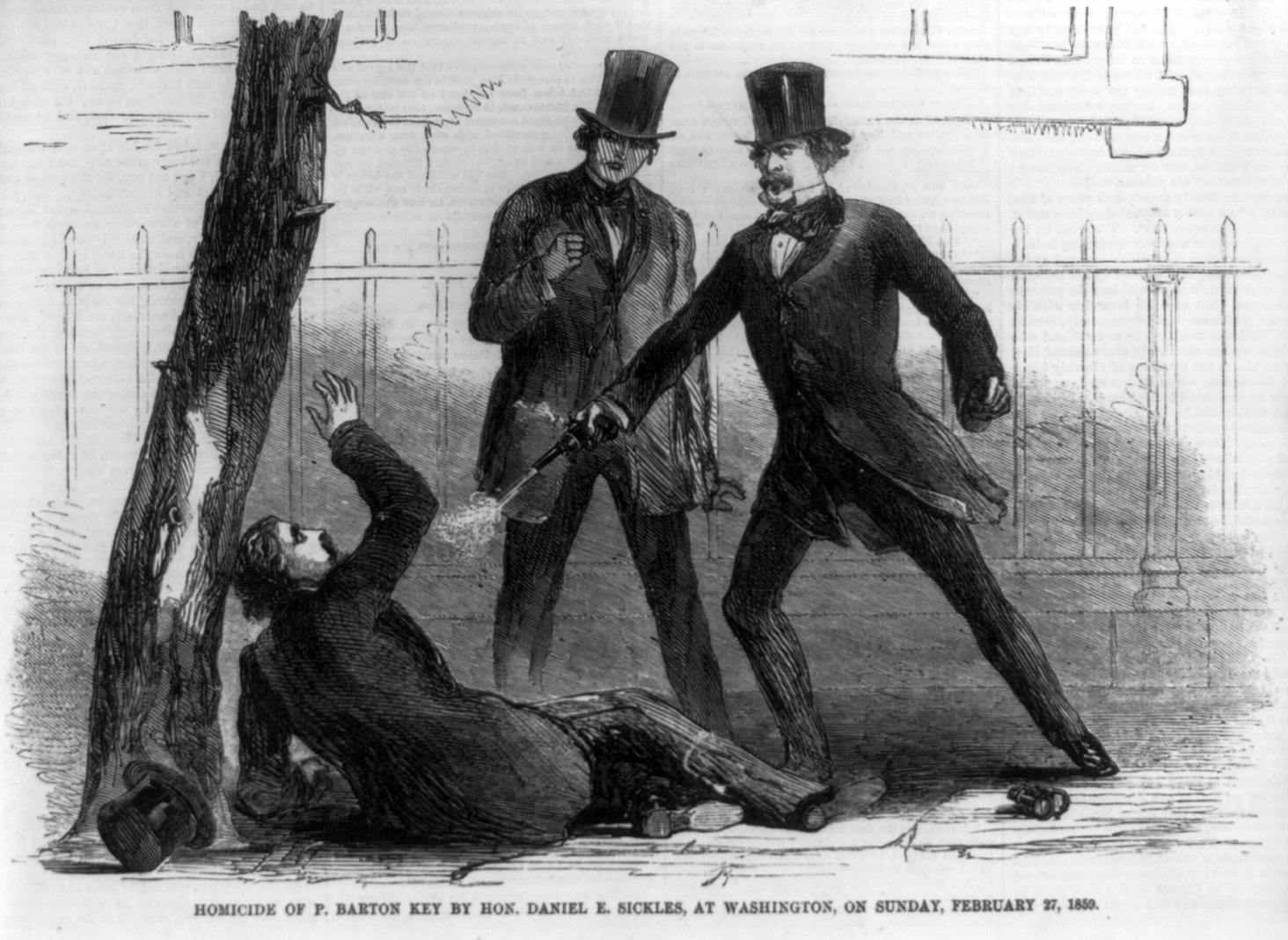
A Harper's Weekly depiction of Sickles shooting Key

Daniel Sickles was a member of the United States House of Representatives from New York. He was married to Teresa Bagioli Sickles, the daughter of composer Antonio Bagioli. Sickles' wife had begun an affair with Philip Barton Key, the United States attorney for the District of Columbia and the son of Francis Scott Key, writer of The Star-Spangled Banner. On Sunday, February 27, 1859, Sickles confronted Key in Lafayette Square, declaring, "Key, you scoundrel, you have dishonored my home; you must die", then shot Key to death. Sickles then went to the home of Attorney General Black and admitted his crime. The subsequent Thursday he was charged with murder by a grand jury. The Sickles affair gained nationwide media attention for both its scandalous nature and its proximity to the White House. Soon, the press speculated that Daniel Sickles' political esteem was due to an affair between his wife and President Buchanan. Prominent criminal lawyer James T. Brady and his partner, John Graham, came to Sickles' defense, and solicited Stanton to join their team.

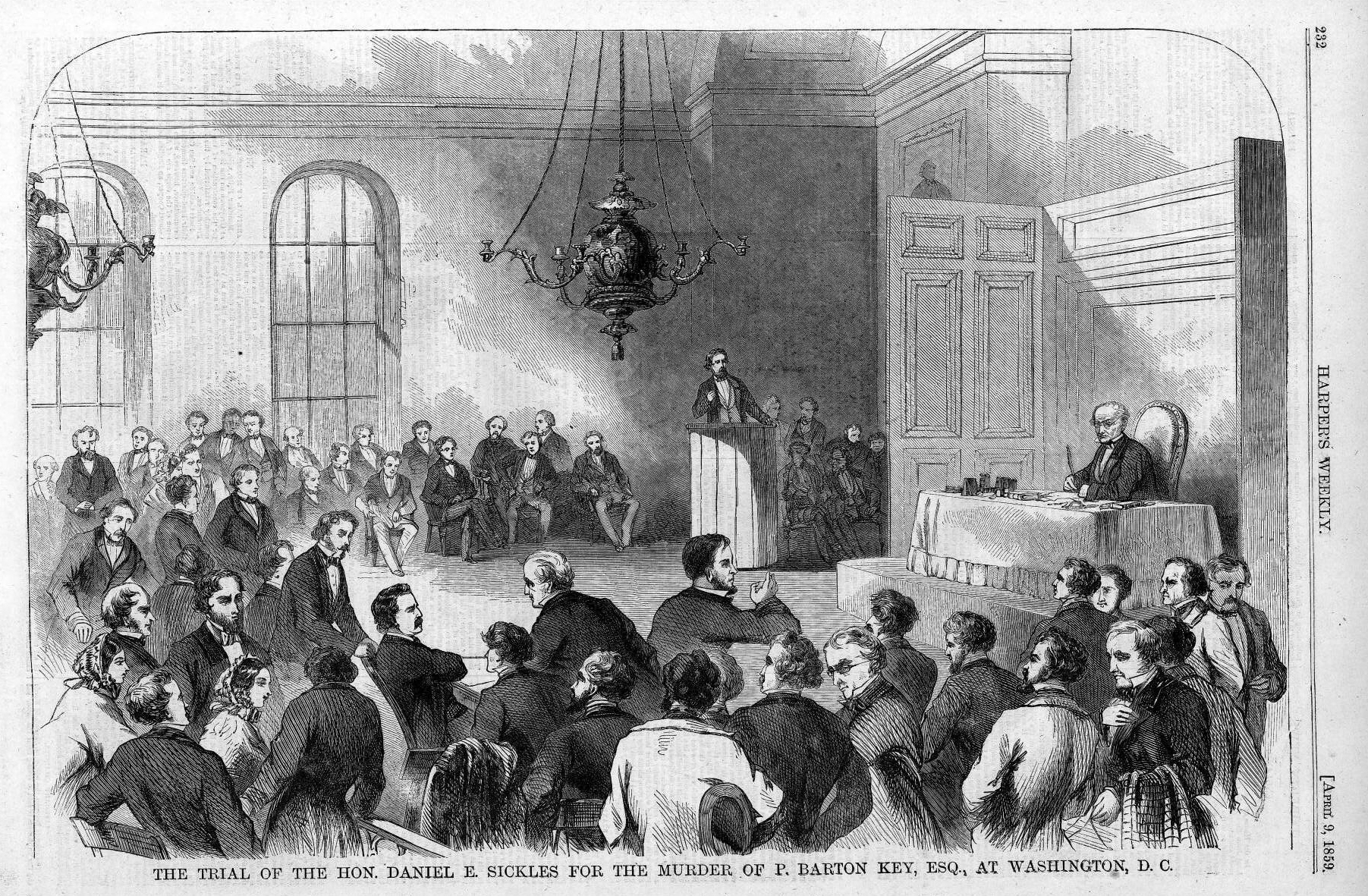
A depiction of the scene in the courtroom during Daniel Sickles' trial

Arguments for the trial began on April 4. The prosecution wanted to advance the theory that Sickles had also committed adultery and did not pay very much mind to his wife or her activities. When the judge disallowed this, the prosecution opted instead to highlight the heinous nature of Sickles' murder, and not address his reasons for committing the crime. Sickles' defense countered that Sickles had suffered from a temporary bout of insanity, the first successful such instance of an insanity plea in American jurisprudence. The events in the courtroom during the trial were nothing if not dramatic. When Stanton delivered closing arguments, stating that marriage is sacred and that a man should have the right to defend his marriage against those who chose to defile the purity of the sacrament, the courtroom erupted in cheers. A law student described Stanton's argument during the trial, "a typical piece of Victorian rhetoric, an ingenious thesaurus of aphorisms on the sanctity of the family." The jury in the case deliberated for just over an hour before declaring Sickles not guilty. The judge ordered Sickles' release from arrest. Outside the courthouse, Sickles, Stanton and company met a throng of individuals in adulation of the victory.

== Early work in politics (1860–1862) ==
During the 1860 United States presidential election, Stanton supported Vice President John C. Breckinridge, due to his work with the Buchanan administration and his belief that only a win by Breckinridge would keep the country together. Privately, he predicted that Lincoln would win.

=== Buchanan administration ===
In late 1860, President Buchanan was formulating his yearly State of the Union address to Congress, and asked Attorney General Black to offer insight into the legality and constitutionality of secession. Black then asked Stanton for advice. Stanton approved a strongly worded draft of Black's response to Buchanan, which denounced secession from the Union as illegal. Buchanan gave his address to Congress on December 3. Meanwhile, Buchanan's cabinet was growing more discontent with his handling of secession, and several members deemed him too weak on the issue. On December 5th, his secretary of the treasury, Howell Cobb, resigned. On December 9th, Secretary of State Lewis Cass, disgruntled over Buchanan's failure to defend the government's interests in the South, tendered his resignation. Black was nominated to replace Cass on December 12. About a week later, Stanton, at the time in Cincinnati, was told to come to Washington at once, for the Senate had confirmed him as Buchanan's new Attorney General. He was sworn in on December 20th.

Stanton met a cabinet in disarray over the issue of secession. Buchanan did not want to agitate the South any further and sympathized with the South's cause. On December 9th, Buchanan had agreed with South Carolinian congressmen that the military installations in the state would not be reinforced unless force against them was perpetrated. However, on the day that Stanton assumed his position, Maj. Robert Anderson moved his unit to Fort Sumter, South Carolina, which the Southerners viewed as Buchanan reneging on his promise. South Carolina issued an ordinance of secession soon after, declaring itself independent of the United States. The South Carolinians demanded that federal forces leave Charleston Harbor altogether; they threatened carnage if they did not get compliance. The following day, Buchanan gave his cabinet a draft of his response to the South Carolinians. Secretaries Thompson and Philip Francis Thomas, of the Treasury Department, thought the president's response too pugnacious; Stanton, Black and Postmaster General Joseph Holt thought it too placatory. Isaac Toucey, Secretary of the Navy, was alone in his support of the response.

Stanton was unnerved by Buchanan's ambivalence towards the South Carolina secession crisis and wanted to stiffen him against complying with the South's demands. On December 30th, Black came to Stanton's home, and the two agreed to pen their objections to Buchanan ordering a withdrawal from Fort Sumter. If he did such a thing, the two men, along with Postmaster General Holt, agreed that they would resign, delivering a crippling blow to the administration. Buchanan obliged them. (Note: In years subsequent, and after a falling out between him and Stanton, Black said that it was he, and he alone, that authored the document and was responsible for Buchanan's decision. Stanton did not deny this, merely saying that he was part of the process. In a letter to a friend, Stanton said that, at that moment, Black was going to the White House to "present the written objections, which [Stanton had] just prepared.") The South Carolinian delegates got their response from President Buchanan on New Year's Eve 1860; the president would not withdraw forces from Charleston Harbor.

By February 1st, six Southern states had followed South Carolina's lead and passed ordinances of secession, declaring themselves to no longer be a part of the United States. On February 18th, Jefferson Davis was sworn in as the president of the Confederate States. Meanwhile, Washington was astir with talk of coups and conspiracies. Stanton believed that discord would ravage the capital on February 13, when the electoral votes were being counted; however, nothing happened. Again, Stanton thought that when Lincoln was sworn in on March 4th, there would be violence; this did not come to pass. Lincoln's inauguration did give Stanton a flickering of hope that his efforts to keep Fort Sumter defended would not be in vain, and that Southern aggression would be met with force in the North. In his inauguration speech, Lincoln did not say he would outlaw slavery throughout the nation, but he did say that he would not support secession in any form, and that any attempt to leave the Union was not lawful. In Stanton, Lincoln's words were met with cautious optimism. The new president submitted his choices for his cabinet on March 5, and by that day's end, Stanton was no longer the attorney general. He lingered in his office for a while to help settle in and guide his replacement, Edward Bates.

=== Advisor to Simon Cameron ===
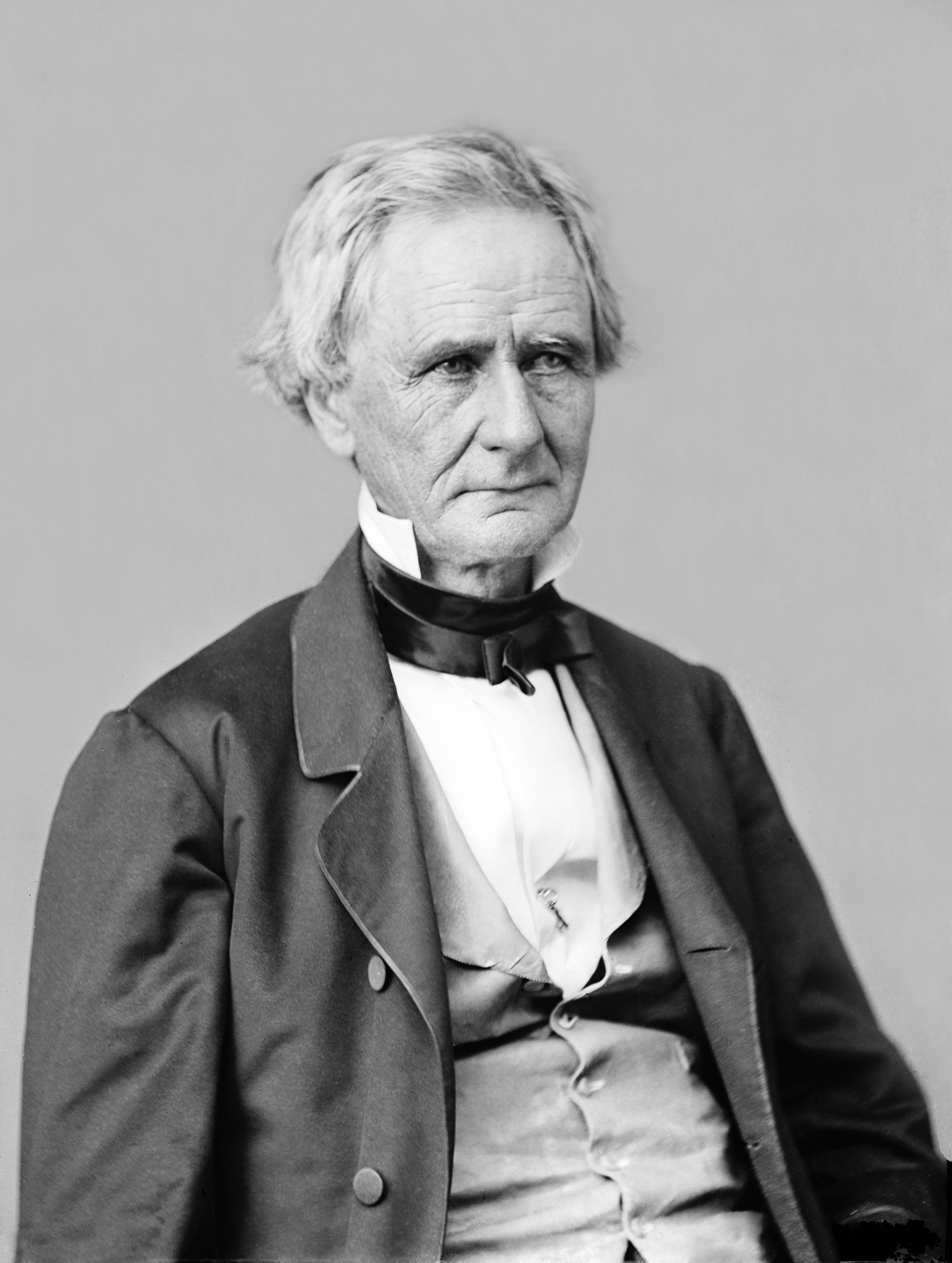
Simon Cameron, Lincoln's secretary of war before Stanton

On July 21st, the North and the South experienced their first major clash at Manassas Junction in Virginia, the First Battle of Bull Run. Northerners believed the battle would end the war and decisively defeat the Confederacy; however, the bloody encounter ended with the Union Army retreating to Washington. Lincoln wanted to bolster Northern numbers afterwards, with many in the North believing the war would be more arduous than they initially expected, but when more than 250,000 men signed up, the federal government did not have enough supplies for them. The War Department had states buy the supplies, assuring them that they would be reimbursed. This led to states selling the federal government items that were usually damaged or worthless at very high prices. Nonetheless, the government bought them.

Soon, Simon Cameron, Lincoln's secretary of war, was being accused of incompetently handling his department, and some wanted him to resign. Cameron sought out Stanton to advise him on legal matters concerning the War Department's acquisitions, among other things. Calls for Cameron to resign grew louder when he endorsed a bombastic November 1861 speech given by Col. John Cochrane to his unit. "[W]e should take the slave by the hand, placing a musket in it, and bid him in God's name strike for the liberty of the human race", Cochrane said. Cameron embraced Cochrane's sentiment that slaves should be armed, but it was met with repudiation in Lincoln's cabinet. Caleb B. Smith, the Secretary in the Department of the Interior, scolded Cameron for his support of Cochrane.

Cameron inserted a call to arm the slaves in his report to Congress, which would be sent along with Lincoln's address to the legislature. Cameron gave the report to Stanton, who amended it with a passage that went even further in demanding that slaves be armed, stating that those who rebel against the government lose their claims to any type of property, including slaves, and that it was "clearly the right of the Government to arm slaves when it may become necessary as it is to use gunpowder or guns taken from the enemy". Cameron gave the report to Lincoln, and sent several copies to Congress and the press. Lincoln wanted the portions containing calls to arm the slaves removed, and ordered the transmission of Cameron's report be stopped and replaced with an altered version. Congress received the version without the call to arm slaves, while the press received a version with it. When newspapers published the document in its entirety, Lincoln was excoriated by Republicans, who thought him weak on the issue of slavery, and disliked that he wanted the plea to arm slaves removed.

The president resolved to dismiss Cameron when abolitionists in the North settled over the controversy. Cameron would not resign until he was sure of his successor and that he could leave the cabinet without damaging his reputation. When a vacancy in the post of Minister to Russia presented itself, Cameron and Lincoln agreed that he would fill the post when he resigned. As for a successor, Lincoln thought Joseph Holt best for the job, but his secretary of state, William H. Seward, wanted Stanton to succeed Cameron. Salmon Chase, Stanton's friend and Lincoln's treasury secretary, agreed. Stanton had been preparing for a partnership with Samuel L. M. Barlow in New York, but abandoned these plans when he heard of his possible nomination. Lincoln nominated Stanton to the post of Secretary of War on January 13. He was confirmed two days following.

== Lincoln administration (1862–1865) ==
=== Early days in office ===
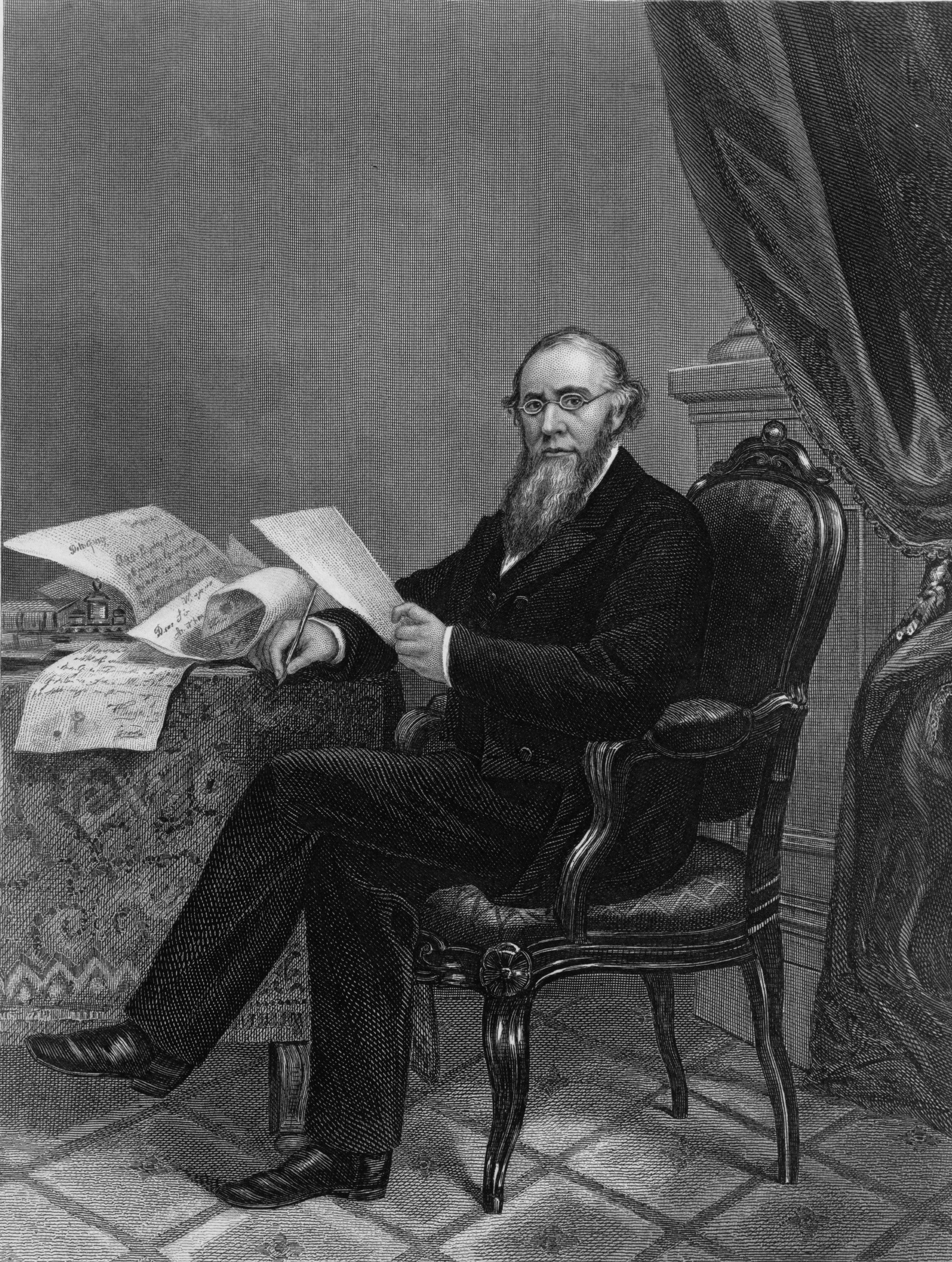
Stanton as Secretary of War

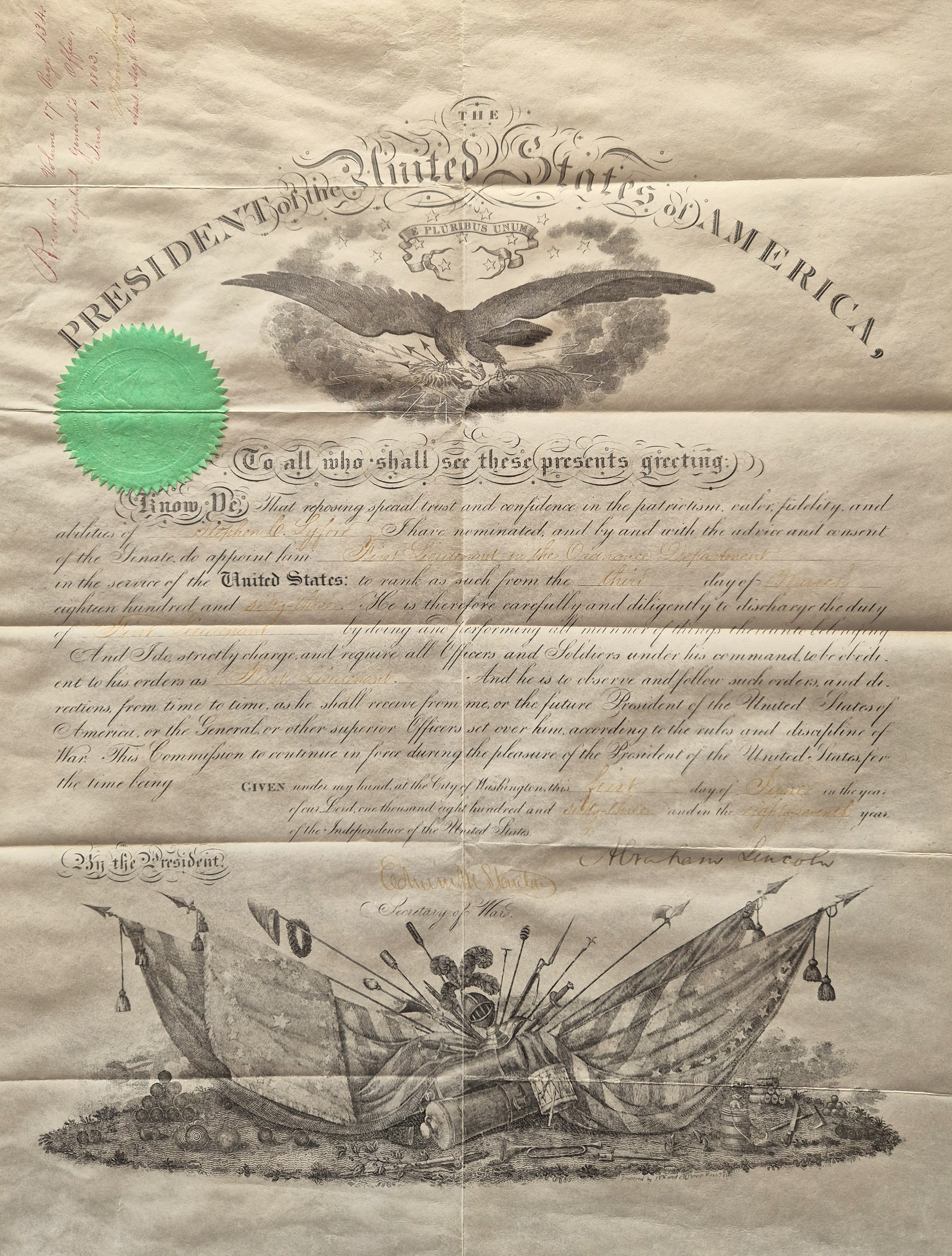
"Military Appointment" by President Abraham Lincoln, issued at the first day of June 1863, also signed by Secretary of War Edwin Stanton

Under Cameron, the War Department had earned the moniker "the lunatic asylum." The department was barely respected among soldiers or government officials, and its authority was routinely disregarded. The generals wielded operating authority in the army, while the President and the War Department intervened only in exceptional circumstances. The department also had strained relations with Congress, especially Representative John Fox Potter, head of the House "Committee on Loyalty of Federal employees", which sought to root out Confederate sympathizers in the government. Potter had prodded Cameron to remove about fifty individuals he suspected of Confederate sympathies; Cameron had paid him no mind.

Stanton was sworn in on January 20. Immediately, he set about repairing the fractious relationship between Congress and the War Department. Stanton met with Potter on his first day as secretary, and on the same day, dismissed four persons whom Potter deemed unsavory. This was well short of the fifty people Potter wanted gone from the department, but he was nonetheless pleased. Stanton also met with Senator Benjamin Wade and his Joint Committee on the Conduct of the War. The committee was a necessary and fruitful ally; it had subpoena power, thus allowing it to acquire information Stanton could not, and could help Stanton remove War Department staffers. Wade and his committee were happy to find an ally in the executive branch, and met with Stanton often thereafter. Stanton made a number of organizational changes within the department as well. He appointed John Tucker, an executive at the Philadelphia & Reading Railroad, and Peter H. Watson, his partner in the reaper case, to be his assistant secretaries, and had the staff at the department expanded by over sixty employees. Further, Stanton appealed to the Senate to cease appointments of military officers until he could review the more than 1,400 individuals up for promotion. Hitherto, military promotions were a spoils system, where individuals favorable to the administration were given promotions, regardless of merit. This ceased under Stanton. (Note: Stanton even tore up two written requests from First Lady Mary Todd Lincoln to promote an individual favorable to the Lincoln administration, and later lambasted her for making such a request. He also refused to appoint Benjamin Tappan, Jr., his sister Oella's son, until Lincoln intervened.)

On January 29, Stanton ordered that all contracts with foreign manufacturers for military materials and supplies be voided and replaced with domestic contracts, and that no such further contracts be made with foreign companies. The order provoked apprehension in Lincoln's cabinet. The United Kingdom and France were searching for cause to recognize and support the Confederates, and Stanton's order might give it to them. Secretary of State Seward thought the order would "complicate the foreign situation." Stanton persisted, and his January 29 order stood.

Meanwhile, Stanton worked to create an effective transportation and communication network across the North. His efforts focused on railroads and telegraph lines. Stanton worked with Senator Wade to push through Congress a bill that would codify the ability of the president and his administration to forcibly seize railroad and telegraph lines for their purposes. Railroad companies in the North were generally accommodating to the federal government's needs and desires, and the law was rarely invoked. Stanton also secured the government's telegraph operation. He relocated the central military telegraph office from McClellan's army headquarters to his department, a decision the general was none too pleased with. The relocation gave Stanton closer control over the military's communications operations, and he exploited this.

Stanton required all members of the press to work through Assistant Secretary Watson, who excluded unwanted journalists from access to official government correspondence. If a member of the press went elsewhere in the department, he would be charged with espionage.

Before Stanton's appointment as War Secretary, President Lincoln apportioned responsibility for the security of government against treachery and other unsavory activities to several members of his cabinet, mostly Secretary Seward, as he did not trust Attorney General Bates or Secretary Cameron. Under Secretary Stanton, the War Department had consolidated responsibility for internal security. A linchpin of Seward's strategy to maintain internal security was the use of arbitrary arrests and detentions, and Stanton continued this practice. Democrats harshly criticized the use of arbitrary arrests, but Lincoln contended that it was his primary responsibility to maintain the integrity and security of the government and that waiting until possible betrayers committed guilty acts would hurt the government. At Stanton's behest, Seward continued the detention of only the most risky inmates and released all others.

=== General-in-Chief ===
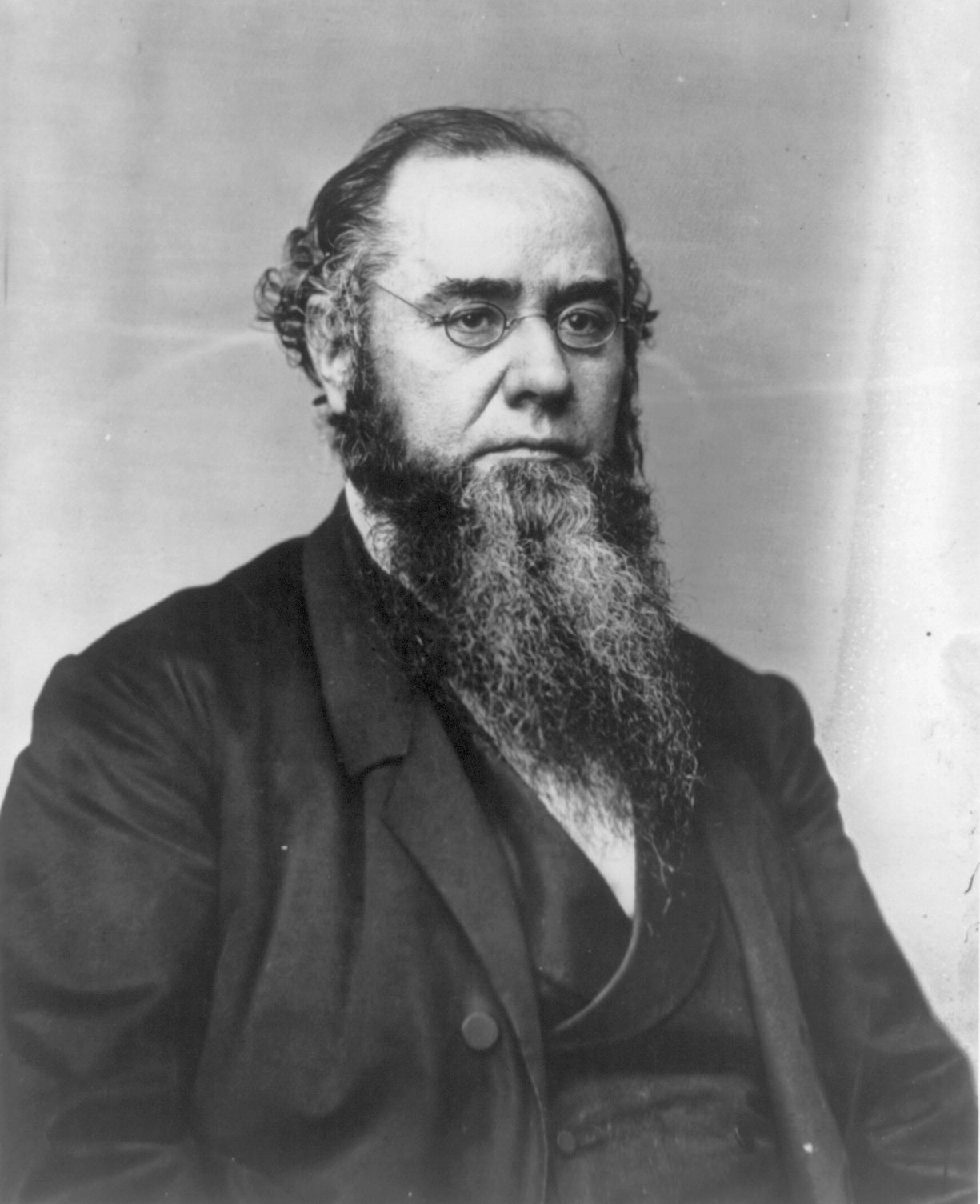
Photograph of Edwin Stanton

Lincoln eventually grew tired of McClellan's inaction, especially after his January 27, 1862, order to advance against the Confederates in the Eastern Theatre had resulted in no action by McClellan. On March 11, Lincoln relieved McClellan of his position as general-in-chief of the whole Union army, leaving him in charge of only the Army of the Potomac, and replaced him with Stanton. This created a bitter chasm in the relationship between Stanton and McClellan. McClellan's supporters claimed that Stanton "usurped" the role of general-in-chief, and that the Secretary of War should have no authority over military commanders. Lincoln ignored such calls, leaving military power consolidated with himself and Stanton.

Meanwhile, McClellan was preparing for the first major military operation in the Eastern Theatre, the Peninsula Campaign. The Army of the Potomac began its movement to the Virginia Peninsula on March 17. The first action of the campaign was at Yorktown. Lincoln wanted McClellan to assault Yorktown, but McClellan instead laid siege. Washington politicians were angered by McClellan's choice. McClellan, however, requested reinforcements for the siege: the 11,000 men in Maj. Gen. William B. Franklin's division, of Maj. Gen. Irvin McDowell's I Corps. Stanton wanted I Corps to stay together and march on to Richmond, but McClellan persisted, and Stanton eventually capitulated.

In addition, Stanton ordered McClellan to transfer one of his corps east to defend Washington.

By late June 1862, the Army of the Potomac was just a few miles from the Confederate capital, Richmond. Then Confederate commander Robert E. Lee launched his Seven Days counterattack. McClellan and the Army of the Potomac were pushed back to Harrison's Landing in Virginia, where they were protected by Union gunboats.

In Washington, Stanton was blamed for McClellan's defeat by the press and the public. On April 3, Stanton had suspended military recruiting efforts under the mistaken impression that McClellan's Peninsula Campaign would end the war. With McClellan retreating and the casualties from the campaign piling up, more men were needed. Stanton restored recruiting operations on July 6, when McClellan's defeat on the Peninsula was firmly established, but the damage was done. The press, angered by Stanton's strict measures regarding journalistic correspondence, unleashed torrents of scorn on him, furthering the narrative that he was the only encumbrance to McClellan's victory.

The attacks hurt Stanton, and he considered resigning, but he remained in his position at Lincoln's request. Lincoln decided that the Union army needed better organization at the highest level. Having Stanton as de facto army commander-in-chief could not continue. Instead Lincoln appointed Gen. Henry W. Halleck, a skilled professional soldier, as general-in-chief, effective July 23.

=== War rages on ===
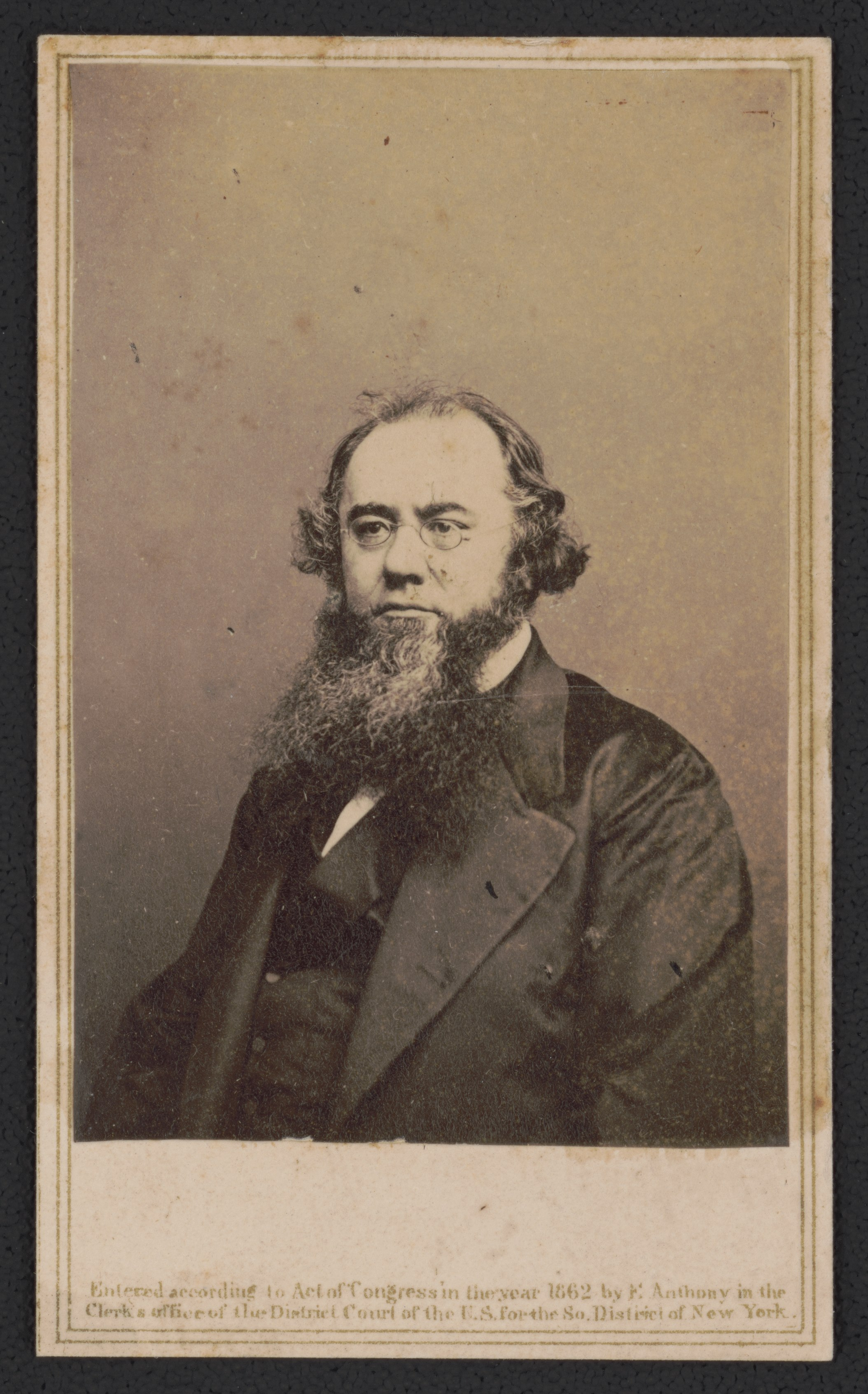
Secretary of War Edwin Stanton, 1862. From the Liljenquist Family Collection of Civil War Photographs, Prints and Photographs Division, Library of Congress

In the final days of August 1862, Lee defeated the Union Army of Virginia in the Second Battle of Bull Run. Many people, including Halleck and Stanton, thought Lee would attack Washington. Instead, Lee invaded Maryland.

Lincoln, without consulting Stanton, perhaps knowing Stanton would object, merged the Army of Virginia into McClellan's Army of the Potomac. McClellan won the Battle of Antietam, pushing Lee back into Virginia. McClellan's success emboldened him to demand that Lincoln and his government cease obstructing his plans, Halleck and Stanton be removed, and he be made general-in-chief of the Union Army. Meanwhile, he failed to move aggressively against Lee's retreating army. McClellan's unreasonable requests continued, as did his indolence, and Lincoln's patience with him soon grew thin. On November 5 Lincoln fired McClellan, and then appointed Maj. Gen. Ambrose Burnside to command of the Army of the Potomac.

Burnside's attack at Fredericksburg on December 13 was a disaster.

Maj. Gen. Joseph Hooker replaced Burnside on January 26, 1863. Stanton did not much care for Hooker, who had openly criticized Lincoln's administration and had been insubordinate while serving under Burnside. He preferred Maj. Gen. William Rosecrans from the western theater, but Lincoln disregarded Stanton's opinion. As Thomas and Hyman tell it, Lincoln "chose Hooker because that general had a reputation as a fighter and stood higher in popular esteem at that moment than any other eastern general."

But in the Battle of Chancellorsville in early May 1863, Lee defeated Hooker with 17,000 Union casualties.

Stanton's attempts to raise Northern spirits after the defeat were hampered by reports that, under Hooker, the Army of the Potomac had become grossly undisciplined. Indeed, Hooker's headquarters was described as "combination of barroom and brothel." Stanton petitioned for liquor and women to be forbidden in Hooker's camps.

Lee invaded Maryland and Pennsylvania in June, causing fear in Washington. Disturbing reports came from Hooker's subordinates, such as Brig. Gen. Marsena Patrick: "[Hooker] acts like a man without a plan, & is entirely at a loss what to do, or how to match the enemy, or counteract his movements." Furthermore, like McClellan, Hooker kept overestimating Lee's numbers, and said the Lincoln's administration did not have full confidence in him. Hooker resigned on June 27; Stanton and Lincoln decided that his replacement would be Maj. Gen. George Meade, who was appointed the following day.

Meade defeated Lee in the Battle of Gettysburg. News of the victory reached Washington July 4. Soon after, word came of Maj. Gen. Grant's victory at Vicksburg. Northerners were exultant. Stanton even gave a rare speech to a huge crowd outside the War Department's headquarters. But Meade failed to attack Lee's army while it was waiting to cross the Potomac River. When Lee escaped on July 14, Lincoln and Stanton were upset. Stanton affirmed in a letter to a friend that Meade would have his support unreservedly, but that "since the world began no man ever missed so great an opportunity of serving his country as was lost by his neglecting to strike his adversary." Stanton knew, though, that Meade's reluctance came at the advice of his corps commanders, who formerly outranked him.

While action in the Eastern Theater wound down, action in the West heated up. After the two-day Battle of Chickamauga in late September, the Union Army of the Cumberland under Rosecrans was trapped in Chattanooga, Tennessee. The situation in Chattanooga was desperate. Assistant Secretary of War Charles Anderson Dana reported that Rosecrans might only be able to fight for another 15–20 days, and that without at least 20,000 to 25,000 more men, Chattanooga would be lost. Lincoln responded by transferring 20,000 men from the Army of the Potomac to Tennessee. Stanton organized the movement by rail and steamboat of these troops, who traveled 1,200 miles in only ten days. Lincoln and Stanton also made Grant commander of almost the entire western theater. Under Grant, the Union forces defeated the Confederates at Chattanooga.

=== End of the war ===
Grant became general-in-chief of the Union Army, and also took charge in Virginia. In the 1864 Overland Campaign, Grant drove Lee's army back, and besieged them in Petersburg near Richmond, but suffered heavy casualties.

This led to widespread discouragement in the North, and possible Democrat victory in the 1864 elections. Stanton took action to prevent this. Before the election, he ordered that soldiers from key states such as Illinois, Lincoln's home state, receive furloughs so they could go home to vote. Stanton also used his powers at the War Department to ensure that Republican voters were not harassed or threatened at the polls.

Lincoln was re-elected and Republicans also won major congressional and gubernatorial victories in Ohio, Indiana, Kentucky, and New York. Stanton's work played no small part in securing the victory, especially his furlough order. "The men who were doing the fighting had voted for more of it in order to make their efforts worth while," Thomas and Hyman state.

On March 3, 1865, the day before Lincoln's second inauguration, Grant wired to Washington that Lee had sent representatives to him to sue for peace. Lincoln initially responded that Grant should get peace with the South by any means necessary. However, Stanton declared that it is the president's responsibility to negotiate with rebels; otherwise, the president is useless and little more than a figurehead. Lincoln immediately changed his position. At Lincoln's urging, Stanton told Grant to "have no conference with General Lee unless it be for the capitulation of Gen. Lee's army, or on some minor, and purely, military matter." Further, Grant was not to "decide, discuss, or confer upon any political questions. Such matters the President holds in his own hands; and will submit them to no military conferences or conventions." Grant agreed.

On April 2, 1865, Union troops finally broke into Petersburg. Stanton, who had stayed close to his telegraph for days, told his wife that evening: "Petersburg is evacuated and probably Richmond. Put out your flags." Stanton was worried that President Lincoln, who was visiting Grant's headquarters, was in danger of being captured, and warned him. Lincoln disagreed, but was happy for Stanton's concern. The president wrote Stanton: "It is certain now that Richmond is in our hands, and I think I will go there to-morrow."

News of Richmond's fall, which came on April 3, touched off furious excitement throughout the North.

"The news spread fast, and people streaming from stores and offices speedily filled the thoroughfares. Cannons began firing, whistles tooted, horns blew, horsecars were forced to a standstill, the crowd yelled and cheered."

Stanton was overjoyed. At his bidding, candles were put in the windows of each of the Department's properties, while bands played "The Star-Spangled Banner." Furthermore, the department's headquarters were adorned with American flags, along with an image of a bald eagle holding in its talons a scroll with "Richmond" written on it. The night Richmond fell, Stanton tearily gave an impromptu speech to the crowd outside the War Department.

Lee and the remnants of his army fled west, pursued by Grant. On April 9, Lee finally surrendered, effectively ending the war. On April 13, Stanton suspended conscription and recruiting, as well as the army's acquisition efforts.

=== Lincoln assassinated ===
On April 14, Lincoln invited Stanton, Grant, and their wives to join him at Ford's Theatre the next evening. Lincoln had invited Stanton to go with him to the theatre several times, invitations Stanton routinely rejected. Further, neither Stanton's nor Grant's wives would go unless the other went. The Grants used a visit to their children in New Jersey as their excuse. Finally, Lincoln decided to go to the theatre with Major Henry Rathbone and his fiancée. Stanton retired home that night after visiting a bedridden secretary Seward. He went to bed at about 10 pm. Soon after, he heard Ellen yell from downstairs: "Mr. Seward is murdered!" Stanton rushed downstairs. Upon hearing that Lincoln, too, might be dead, Stanton grew intensely animated. He wanted to leave immediately. He was cautioned: "You mustn't go out ... As I came up to the house I saw a man behind the tree-box, but he ran away, and I did not follow him." Stanton paid little mind to the man; he found a cab and went to Seward's home.

At his arrival, Stanton was told that Lincoln had in fact been attacked. Stanton ordered that the homes of all members of the cabinet and the vice president be put under guard. Stanton pushed through a crowd at the secretary's home to find an unconscious Seward being attended to by a doctor in a bloody third-floor room. Seward's son, Frederick, was left paralyzed by the attack. Stanton and Secretary of the Navy Gideon Welles, who had come to Seward's home moments before, decided to go to Ford's Theatre to see the president. The two secretaries went by carriage, accompanied by Quartermaster General Montgomery Meigs and David K. Cartter, a judge of the District Court for the District of Columbia.

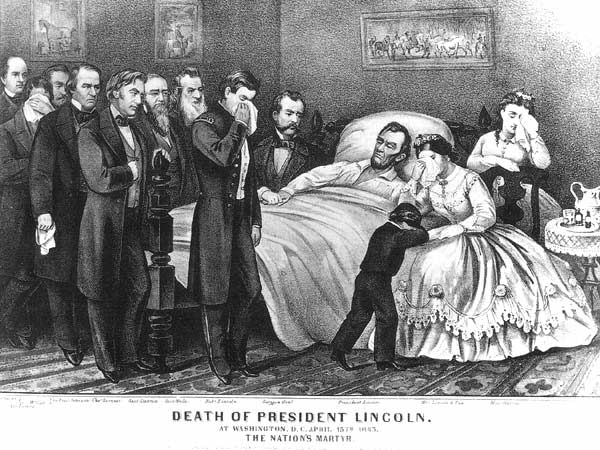
Abraham Lincoln lay on his deathbed at the Petersen House in Washington, surrounded by family, friends and government officials.

Stanton found Lincoln at the Petersen House across from the theatre. Lincoln lay on a bed diagonally because of his height. Several accounts say that when he saw the dying President, Stanton began to weep. However, William Marvel in Lincoln's Autocrat: The Life of Edwin Stanton wrote that "Stanton's emotional detachment and his domineering persona made him valuable that night, as others wallowed in anguish." Thomas and Hyman wrote: "Always before, death close at hand had unsettled him close to the point of imbalance. Now he seemed calm, grim, decisive, in complete outward control of himself." Andrew Johnson, about whom Stanton, and the country, knew little, was sworn in as president at 11 am on April 15. However, Stanton, who had planned to retire at the end of the war, "was indeed in virtual control of the government", according to Thomas and Hyman. "He had charge of the Army, Johnson was barely sworn in and vastly unsure of himself, and Congress was not in session."

Stanton ordered testimony taken from those who saw the attack. Witnesses blamed actor John Wilkes Booth for the assassination. Stanton put all soldiers in Washington on guard, and ordered a lockdown of the city. Rail traffic to the south was to be halted, and fishing boats on the Potomac were not to come ashore. Stanton also called Grant back to the capital from New Jersey.

On April 15, Washington was, as journalist George A. Townsend said, "full of Detective Police". At Stanton's request, the New York Police Department joined the War Department's detectives' tireless search for Booth and his accomplices. Booth escaped, but several others were arrested. Stanton had conspirators Lewis Powell, Michael O'Laughlen, Edmund Spangler, and George Atzerodt held in the lower deck of the monitor USS Montauk near the Washington Navy Yard. Other plotters were confined aboard USS Saugus. The prisoners on both ships were bound by ball and chain, with handcuffs attached to an iron rod. Stanton also ordered a bag placed over each captive's head, with a hole in it to allow for eating and breathing. Mary Surratt was kept at Old Capitol Prison. Booth was shot and killed by pursuers in Virginia. His body was put aboard Montauk. After an autopsy was performed, and Booth's identity confirmed beyond any doubt, he was buried in a "secret, unmarked, and unhallowed grave" on Stanton's orders. Stanton knew Booth would be lionized in the South and would not give anyone the opportunity to do so. The conspirators were tried and convicted. All but three were hanged.

== Johnson administration (1865–1868) ==
=== Sherman's truce ===
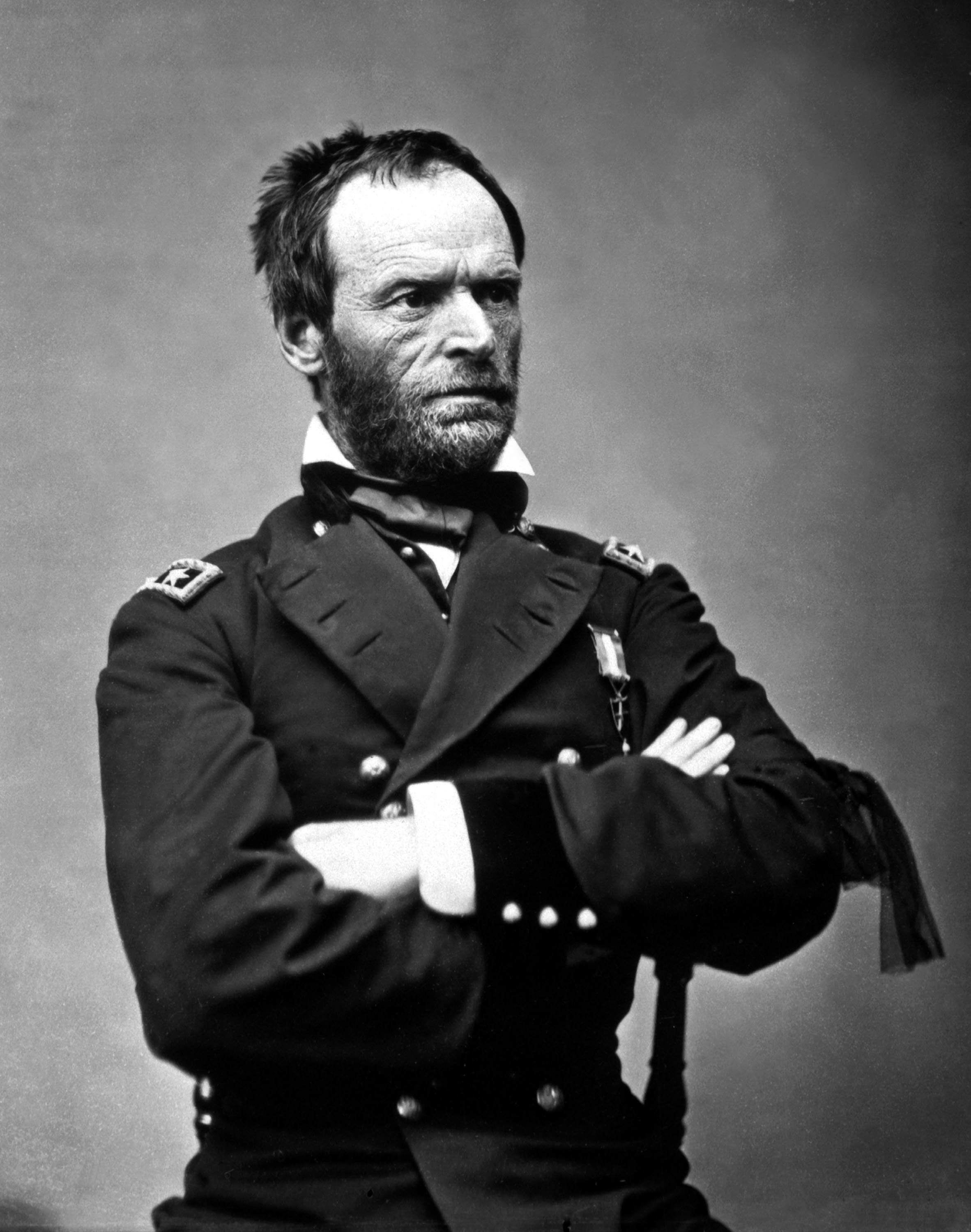
Maj. Gen. William Tecumseh Sherman

Lt. Gen. Grant, failing to find Stanton at the War Department, sent a note to his home by courier on the evening of April 21. The matter was urgent. Maj. Gen. Sherman, who had established his army headquarters in Raleigh, North Carolina, had negotiated a peace deal with Confederate commander Gen. Joseph E. Johnston, with the grace of Confederate States secretary of war John C. Breckinridge. Sherman had been authorized to negotiate with the Southerners only in matters regarding the military, as Grant had been with Lee. Sherman explicitly acknowledged that his negotiations with Confederate leaders were to stay firmly in the realm of military policy, but flouted the limitations anyway. Sherman's deal contained, as expected, a termination of hostilities with the South, but also specified that Southern governments that had rebelled against the United States were to be recognized by the federal government once they swore allegiance to the United States. Further, the deal's terms provided for federal courts to be reinstated in rebellious states, as well as the restoration of property and voting rights to Southerners, and a blanket pardon for Southerners who had rebelled. The deal went even further, allowing Southern troops to place their weapons in the hands of their states' governments, which would effectively rearm the Southern states. Sherman's truce also allotted power to the Supreme Court to resolve jurisdictional disputes between state and local governments in the South, which was a political issue, and not a legal issue, making that a power the court did not constitutionally have.

The courier arrived at Stanton's residence breathless, interrupting his dinner. When he heard the news, Stanton, "in a state of high excitement", rushed to the War Department. He sent for all members of the cabinet in the name of the president. Johnson's cabinet, along with Grant and Preston King, Johnson's advisor, convened at 8 pm that night. Word of Sherman's actions was met with unanimous condemnation by those present. President Johnson instructed Stanton to tell Sherman his deal had been rejected, and that "hostilities should be immediately resumed after giving the Confederates the forty-eight hours' notice required to terminate the truce". Grant would go to Raleigh at once to inform Sherman of Stanton's edict, as well as to assume command of troops in the South.

Stanton took the matter to the press. In addition to publicizing the details of Sherman's deal, Stanton said Sherman intentionally flouted direct orders from both Lincoln and Johnson, and listed nine reasons Sherman's deal had been categorically rejected. Further, Stanton accused Sherman of recklessly opening a path by which Jefferson Davis might flee the country with specie Davis purportedly took with him after abandoning Richmond. The latter claim was based in Sherman's removal of Maj. Gen. George Stoneman's forces from the Greensboro railway—Greensboro was the place to which Davis and other Confederate officials fled. Stanton's words were damning. "It amounted to a castigation of Sherman and virtually accused him of disloyalty", say Thomas and Hyman. Moreover, Sherman being among the most respected generals in the country, Stanton's publication endangered his place in the administration.

Having not seen Stanton's dispatch to the press, Sherman wrote Stanton a conciliatory letter, calling his agreement "folly" and saying that, though he still felt his deal with Johnston and Breckinridge was solid, it was not his place to contest his superior's decision and that he would follow orders. Meantime, Maj. Gen. Halleck, at Grant's request, communicated to several of Sherman's subordinates that they were to move their forces to North Carolina, regardless of what Sherman said. Halleck sent another dispatch to Sherman's generals telling them not to listen to Sherman's edicts at all. After Halleck's order, and reading Stanton's message to the press in a newspaper, Sherman's fury reached a dizzying, explosive tenor. Sherman thought Stanton had unjustifiably characterized him as a disloyal pariah. "I respect [Stanton's] office but I cannot him personally, till he undoes the injustice of the past", Sherman said to Grant. Sherman's brother, Senator John Sherman, wanted the general censured for his actions, but still treated fairly. Sherman himself, and his wife's powerful family, the Ewings, wanted Stanton to publicly take back his statements. Stanton characteristically refused.

In late May, there would be a Grand Review of the Armies, where the Union Army would parade through the streets of Washington. Halleck offered the hospitality of his home to Sherman; the general bluntly refused. He informed Grant of his rejection, stating that he would only listen to orders from Stanton if they were explicitly sanctioned by the president as well. Sherman further stated that "retraction or pusillanimous excusing" would no longer cut it. The only thing acceptable to Sherman would be for Stanton to declare himself a "common libeller". "I will treat Mr. Stanton with like scorn & contempt, unless you have reasons otherwise, for I regard my military career as ended, save and except so far as necessary to put my army into your hands."

Sherman made good on his promise. At the Grand Review, Sherman saluted the President and Grant, but slighted the secretary of war by walking past him without a handshake in full view of the public. Stanton gave no immediate response. Journalist Noah Brooks wrote "Stanton's face, never very expressive, remained immobile". The affront touched off speculation that Stanton was about to resign. Stanton, too, considered leaving his post, but at the request of the president and numerous others, including military personnel, he kept on. In reparative efforts, Sherman's wife brought the Stantons flowers and spent time at their home, but Sherman continued to harbor resentment toward Stanton.

=== Reconstruction ===
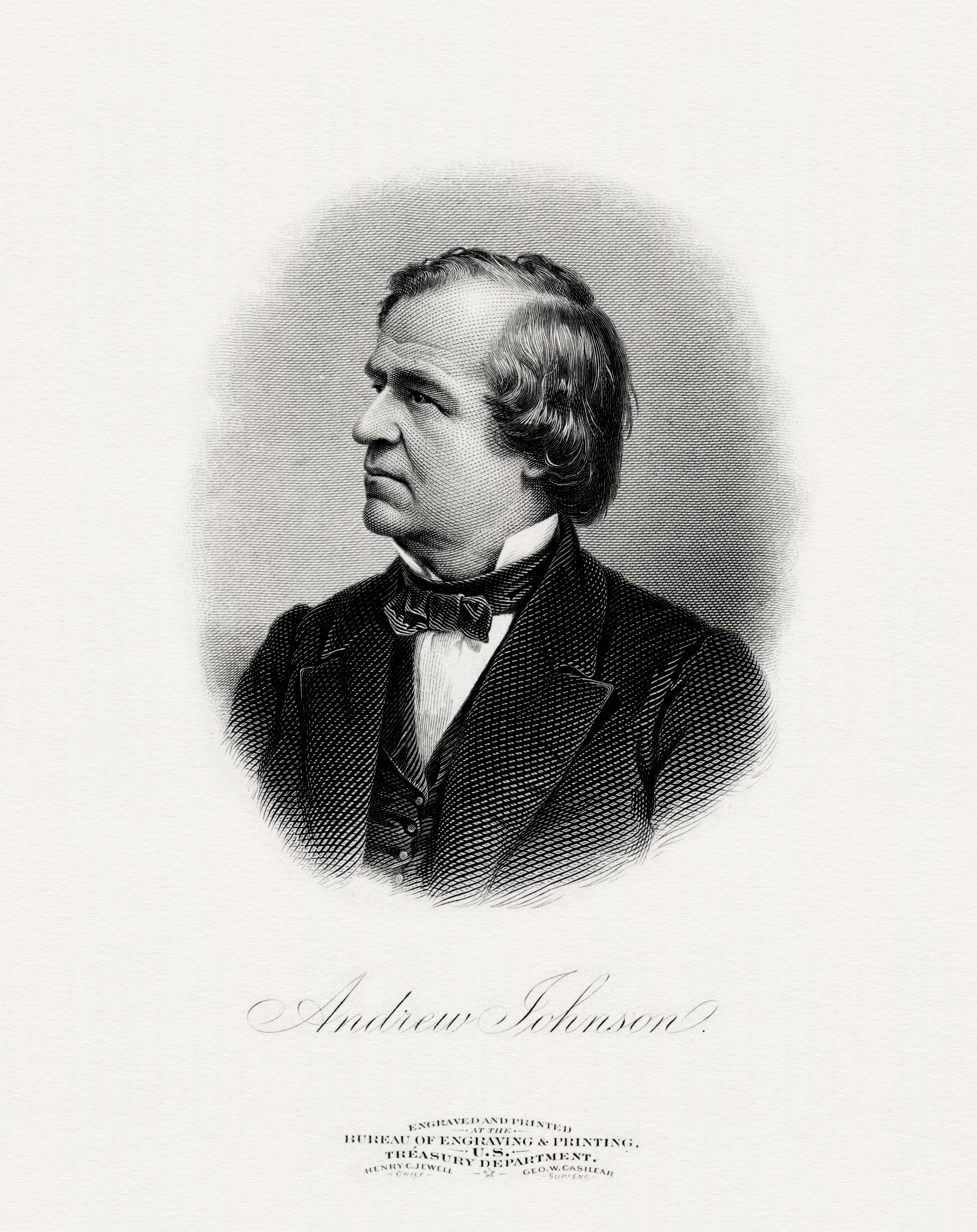
BEP engraved portrait of Andrew Johnson as President

The war was done, and Stanton now bore the substantial task of reshaping the American military establishment such that it would be as capable an apparatus in peacetime as it had proven to be in wartime. To this end, in the North, Stanton reorganized the army into two sections; one to handle "training and ceremonial chores", and another to quell the American Indians in the west, who were agitated and blusterous as a result of the war. In the South, a high priority was mending the power vacuum left in Southern states after the rebellion. Stanton presented his military occupation proposal, which had been endorsed by Lincoln, to the President: two military governments would be established in Virginia and North Carolina, with provost marshals to enforce laws and establish order, tasks the marshals had proven most capable of in the weeks after the end of the war.

President Johnson had promised his Cabinet in their first meeting on April 15 that he would uphold his predecessor's plans for Reconstruction, plans that the deceased president had discussed at length with Stanton. (Note: In his 1863 State of the Union Address, Lincoln declared that his Reconstruction plan had two major facets. Firstly, Lincoln would issue an impartial pardon to individuals in offense against the United States, excepting certain persons of high rank, if they agreed to swear acceptance of the government, Constitution, the Emancipation Proclamation, and all of the country's slave laws. Secondly, acceptance of any state back into the Union would hinge on whether ten percent of those who voted in that state in the 1860 elections swore allegiance to the United States. If this condition were met, the state could establish a government and select delegates to send to a state constitutional convention, and he would recognize and protect the governments.) On May 29, 1865, Johnson issued two proclamations; one appointed William Woods Holden as the interim governor of North Carolina, and another pardoned individuals involved in the rebellion, with a few exceptions, if they agreed to loyalty and acceptance of all laws and edicts regarding slavery. Johnson also recognized Francis Harrison Pierpont's government in Virginia, as well as the governments in Arkansas, Louisiana, and Tennessee, which were formed under Lincoln's ten percent plan. Further, Johnson offered the ten percent plan to several other Southern states.

In his 1865 message to Congress, the Democratic Johnson contended that the only necessary proof of loyalty a state needed to show was ratification of the Thirteenth Amendment. Republicans in Congress disagreed; Senator Charles Sumner and Representative Thaddeus Stevens thought black suffrage was vitally necessary to the nation's security and the continuing dominance of the Republican Party. Republicans used parliamentary procedures to ensure none of the Southern delegates, who were mostly former Confederate leaders, took a seat in Congress, and established a predominantly Republican joint committee to decide Reconstruction matters.

Concerning Reconstruction, the president and Congress were deeply divided. Johnson, even when his amnesty policy had come under heavy criticism, had obdurately supported and continued it. Republicans in Congress, however, came to prefer Stanton's military occupation proposal. The president's support from moderate Republicans dwindled after the gruesome anti-Negro riots in Memphis and New Orleans. The public seemed to be against Johnson as well. In the 1866 congressional elections, Republicans made sweeping gains on their Democratic rivals. In both the House and Senate elections, Republicans gained a two-thirds plurality of the seats. In the new year, some Republicans sought to use their majority to oust Johnson. They presented the Tenure of Office Bill, written with Stanton in mind. The president had long considered dismissing Stanton and replacing him with Maj. Gen. Sherman; the Tenure of Office Bill would have made this illegal without the advice and consent of Congress, which was unlikely to be given for Stanton, who was firmly supported by and cooperating with Republicans. When the bill reached the president's desk, he vetoed it. His veto was overridden the same day.

With the protection offered by the Tenure of Office Act, Stanton's opposition to Johnson became more open. In the following months, Johnson grew increasingly exasperated with his war secretary. Johnson told Grant he intended to remove Stanton and give him the War Secretaryship. Grant opposed the idea. He argued for Stanton's retention and stated that the Tenure of Office Act protected Stanton. Further, Grant said, should the tenure law prove impotent, public opinion would turn further against the administration. Seward, who still respected Stanton greatly, also disagreed with his removal. The two men's words made Johnson teeter in uncertainty; however, his will was stiffened with the support from Secretary Welles and Salmon Chase, now the Supreme Court's Chief Justice — the former previously described Stanton as "selfish, insincere, a dissembler, and treacherous", and the latter having dissolved his friendship with Stanton in aid of his political aspirations. On August 12, 1867, Johnson sent a note to Stanton saying that he was suspended from his position as secretary of war, and was to turn over the department's files and power to Grant. Pursuant to the Tenure of Office Act, he also notified the Senate for its consideration. Stanton grudgingly, but with little resistance, complied.

=== Impeachment ===
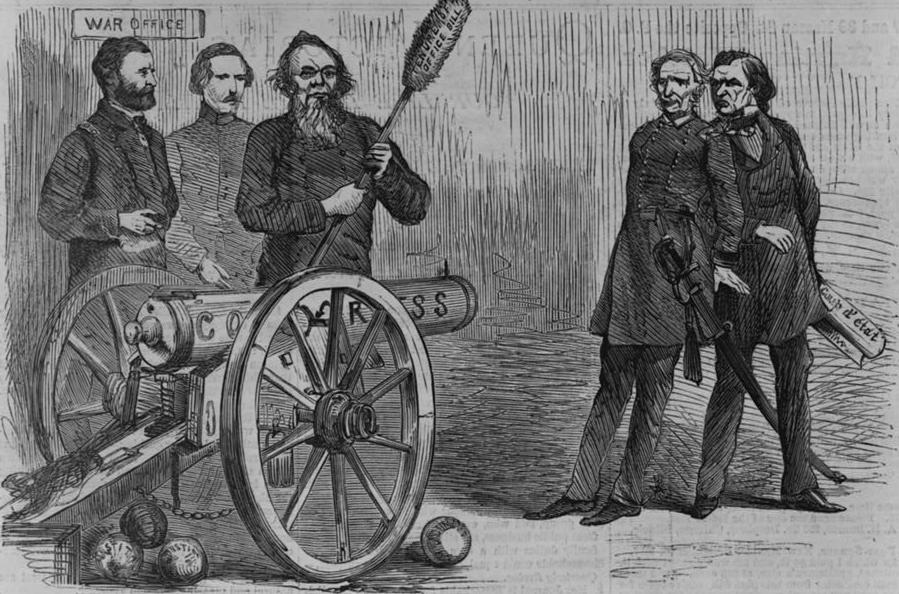
"The Situation", a Harper's Weekly cartoon gives a humorous breakdown of "the situation". Stanton aims a cannon labeled "Congress" at President Andrew Johnson and Lorenzo Thomas to show how he was using Congress to defeat the president and his unsuccessful replacement. He also holds a ramrod marked "Tenure of Office Bill" and cannonballs on the floor are marked "Justice". Ulysses S. Grant and an unidentified man stand to Stanton's left.

On January 13, 1868, the Senate voted overwhelmingly to reinstate Stanton as Secretary of War. Grant, fearing the Act's prescribed penalty of $10,000 in fines and five years in prison, doubly so because of his high likelihood of being the Republican presidential nominee in the upcoming election, turned the office over immediately. Stanton returned to the War Department soon after in "unusually fine spirits and chatting casually", as newspapers reported. His reemergence precipitated a tide of congratulatory writings and gestures, thanking him for his opposition to the greatly disliked Johnson. The president, meanwhile, again began searching for an agreeable person to take the helm at the War Department, but after a few weeks, he seemed to accept Stanton's reinstatement with resignation. He did try to diminish the power of Stanton's office, however, regularly disregarding it. However, with his ability to sign treasury warrants and his backing by Congress, Stanton still held considerable power.

Johnson became singularly focused on enacting Stanton's downfall. "No longer able to bear the congressional insult of an enemy imposed on his Official family," Marvel says, "Johnson began to ponder removing Stanton outright and replacing him with someone palatable enough to win Senate approval." Johnson sought Lorenzo Thomas, the army's adjutant general, to replace Stanton, to which he agreed. On February 21, Johnson notified Congress that he was dismissing Stanton and appointing Thomas as secretary ad interim. Stanton, urged by Republican senators, refused to concede his post. That night, Republicans in the Senate, over Democratic resistance, pushed through a resolution declaring Stanton's removal illegal. In the House, a motion was presented to impeach Johnson. On February 24, the motion was agreed to, and Johnson impeached, with a party-line 126 yeas and 47 nays.

Johnson's trial began in late March. With a predominantly Republican Senate, Johnson's conviction seemed to many a foregone conclusion. However, throughout the process, several senators began showing hesitance to remove the President from office. Stanton, meanwhile, had remained barricaded in the War Department's headquarters for weeks, sneaking off once in a while to visit his home. When it seemed to Stanton that Johnson would not remove him forcefully from office, he began spending more time at home. Stanton watched closely as the trial, which he was convinced would end with Johnson's conviction, continued for several months. When it came time to vote, 35 voted to convict, 19 to acquit, falling one short of the 36-vote supermajority needed for a conviction. The remaining proceedings were delayed for several days for the Republican National Convention. On May 26, after Johnson had been acquitted on all of the 10 other charges, Stanton submitted his resignation to the president.

== Later years and death ==
=== Campaigning in 1868 ===
After Johnson's acquittal and Stanton's resignation, Johnson's administration seized upon the narrative that those who wanted his impeachment were black-hearted, especially Stanton. However, Stanton left office with strong public and Republican support. In other matters, however, Stanton was in peril. His health was in a dire state, the product of his relentless efforts during and after the war, and his finances were greatly lacking. After his resignation, Stanton possessed only the remnants of his salary and a $500 loan. Stanton rejected calls from his fellow Republicans that he run for the Senate, choosing instead to resume his law practice.

Stanton's law efforts stalled when he was called on in August 1868 by Robert C. Schenck, the Republican candidate for one of Ohio's seats in the House of Representatives. Schenck's rival, Democrat Clement Vallandigham, was well known among Republicans for his Copperhead politics, and disliked by Stanton. Believing that Democratic victory at any level would imperil the results of the war, and nullify Republican efforts during the war, Stanton went on a tour of Ohio to campaign for Schenck, other Ohio Republicans and Grant, the Republican presidential nominee. Meanwhile, Stanton's health continued to deteriorate. His physician warned him against making lengthy speeches as his asthma irritated him severely. Stanton's illness precipitated his return to Washington in early November. His feeble state was replaced by excitement when Republicans were victorious in the Schenck–Vallandingham race and the presidential election.

=== Illness worsens ===
Afterwards, Stanton took to arguing a case in the Pennsylvania federal court involving disputed West Virginia lands, which were valued in the millions of dollars because of their coal and timber. By this time, Stanton's illness was painfully visible. (Note: Indeed, the case judge remarked that he had expected "an immense, burly, rough, and resistless man, full of health and power and ready for any emergency. Instead of my ideal, there came in, walking slowly and wearily, a feeble and exhausted invalid, whose death-like pallor shocked all beholders. His argument was delivered in low conversational style, but with wonderful clearness, directness, and completeness.") He grew so sickly that papers related to the case had to be delivered to him at his home. The court ruled against Stanton's client, but Stanton won an appeal at the U.S. Supreme Court to have the case remanded back to the lower court. At Christmas time, Stanton was not able to travel down the stairway of his house, so the family celebrated in his room.

Many speculated at the time that Grant, who had largely ignored Stanton for several months, was due to reward him for his campaigning efforts. Stanton stated, however, that should a position in Grant's administration be offered, he would reject it. Ohio congressman Samuel Shellabarger wrote: "[Stanton] says he has not a great while to live & must devote that to his family..." Early in the new year, Stanton was preparing provisions for his death. However, when spring arrived, Stanton's condition improved. When the rejuvenated Stanton appeared at a congressional enquiry, talks of Grant rewarding Stanton resumed. Several thought Stanton a good fit for the esteemed role of ambassador to Great Britain. Instead, Grant offered Stanton the United States diplomatic mission to Mexico, which he declined.

=== Supreme Court nomination ===
Stanton's health varied for much of 1869. In the latter half of the year, after hearing that Congress had created a new associate justice seat on the Supreme Court, Stanton decided that he would lobby Grant to name him to that position. Stanton used Grant's close friend, Bishop Matthew Simpson, as his proxy to convince Grant of his suitability for a place on the Supreme Court. Grant bypassed Stanton, however, and nominated Attorney General Ebenezer R. Hoar for the seat on December 14, 1869. The following day, Associate Justice Robert Cooper Grier announced his resignation, with the effective date of February 1, 1870, thus creating another vacancy for Grant to fill. Petitions in support of naming Stanton to fill the vacancy on the Court were circulated in both the House of Representatives and the Senate. They were delivered to the president on December 18, 1869. Grant and Vice President Colfax went to Stanton's home to personally extend the nomination on December 19, Stanton's 55th birthday. Grant officially submitted the nomination to the Senate on December 20, and Stanton was confirmed that same day by a vote of 46–11. Stanton wrote a letter of acceptance to the confirmation the next day, but died before assuming office as an associate justice. He remains the only confirmed Supreme Court nominee who accepted but died before taking the prescribed oaths.

=== Death and funeral ===
On the night of December 23, 1869, Stanton complained of pains in his head, neck and spine. His doctor, Surgeon General Joseph Barnes, was called. As had happened on many nights before, Stanton's asthma had made breathing difficult. Stanton's lungs and heart felt constricted, which kept Stanton's wife and children, as well as Barnes, by his bedside. Stanton's condition began to improve at midnight, but then he began, as Marvin states, "[gasping] so strenuously for air that someone ran for the pastor of the Church of the Epiphany, and soon after he arrived Stanton lost consciousness." Stanton died at about 3 am on December 24.

Stanton's body was placed in a black, linen-inlaid coffin in his second-story bedroom. President Grant had wanted a state funeral, but Ellen Stanton wanted as simple an affair as could be had. Nonetheless, Grant ordered all public offices closed, and federal buildings draped in "raiments of sorrow". Flags in several major cities were lowered to half-staff, and gun salutes sounded at army installations around the country. On December 27, his body was carried by artillerymen to his home's parlor. President Grant, Vice President Schuyler Colfax, the Cabinet, the entire Supreme Court, senators, representatives, army officers and other important officials all attended Stanton's funeral. After the eulogy, Stanton's casket was placed atop a caisson, and drawn by four horses to Washington D.C.'s Oak Hill Cemetery at the head of a mile-long (1.6 km) cavalcade.

Stanton was interred beside the grave of his son James Hutchinson Stanton, who had died in infancy several years earlier. An assortment of Cabinet officials, generals, justices and senators carried Stanton's coffin to its final resting place. One of Stanton's professors from Kenyon College performed a service at the graveyard, and a three-volley salute was issued, ending the ceremony.

== Legacy ==
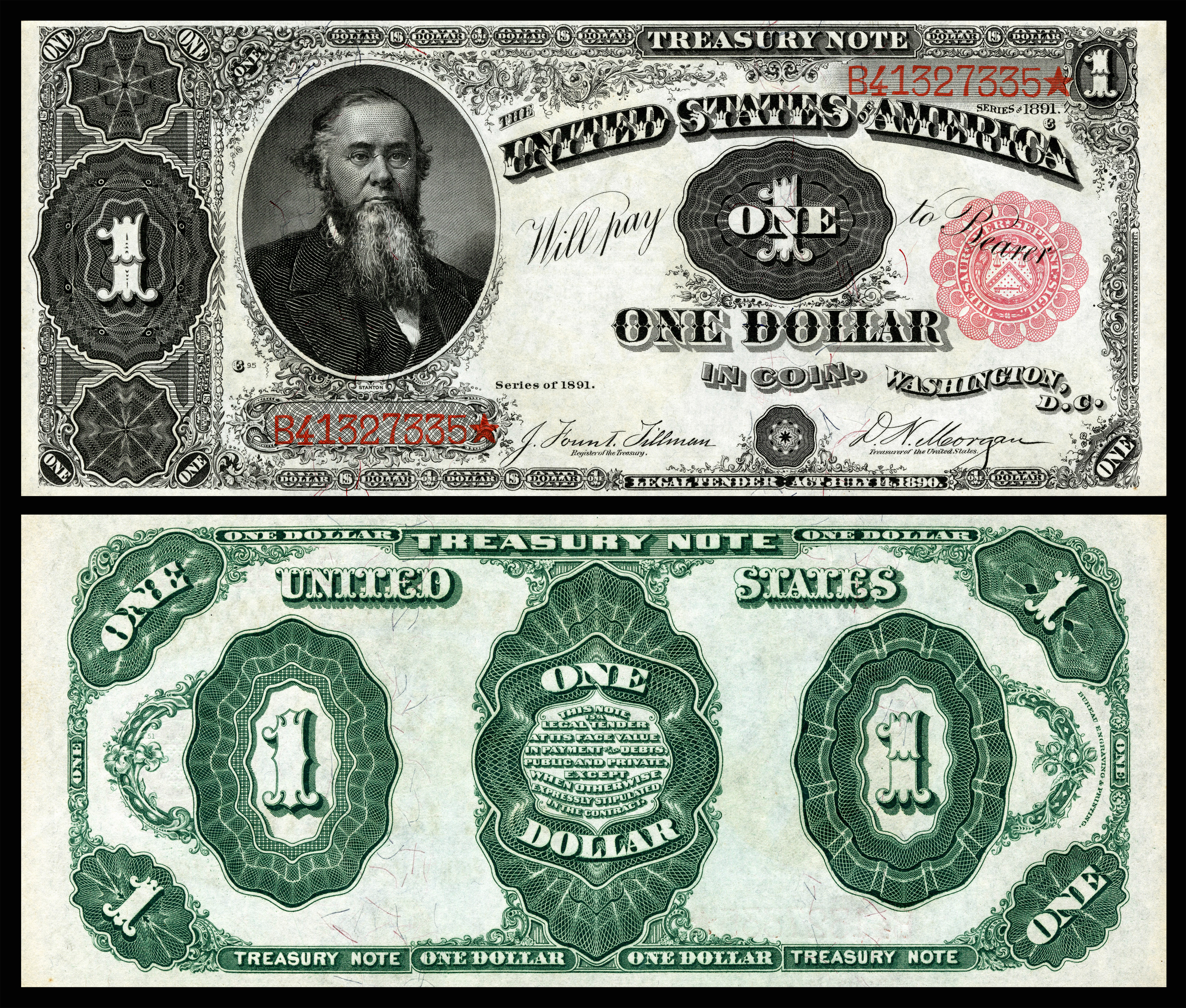
Stanton depicted on a $1 1891 Treasury Note

Various memorials were named for Stanton. A steam engine built in 1862 was named the "E. M. Stanton" in honor of the new secretary of war. Stanton County, Nebraska, is named for him, as is Stanton Park, four blocks from the United States Capitol, and Fort Stanton in Washington, D.C. A neighborhood in Pittsburgh is named for him (Stanton Heights) as well as its main thoroughfare (Stanton Avenue). Stanton Street in Trenton, New Jersey, was also named in his honor. A statute of Stanton is located outside the Jefferson County Courthouse in his hometown of Steubenville, Ohio.

Numerous schools were named after him as well, including Stanton College Preparatory School in Jacksonville, Florida, Stanton Middle School in Hammondsville, Ohio, and Edwin Stanton Elementary School in Philadelphia. Edwin L. Stanton Elementary School in Washington, D.C., was named for his son, who served as the secretary of the District of Columbia.

Stanton was the second American other than a U.S. president to appear on a U.S. postage issue, the first being Benjamin Franklin, who appeared on a stamp in 1847. The only Stanton stamp was issued March 6, 1871. This was also the only stamp issued by the post office that year. The Stanton 7-cent stamp paid the single rate postage for letters sent from the U.S. to various countries in Europe.

A distinctive engraved portrait of Stanton appeared on U.S. paper money in 1890 and 1891. The bills are called "treasury notes" or "coin notes" and are widely collected today. These rare notes are considered by many to be among the finest examples of detailed engraving ever to appear on banknotes. The $1 Stanton "fancyback" note of 1890, with an estimated 900–1,300 in existence relative to the millions printed, ranks as number 83 in the "100 Greatest American Currency Notes" compiled by Bowers and Sundman (2006). Stanton also appears on the fourth issue of Fractional currency, in the amount of 50 cents.

== In popular culture ==
Stanton appears in the 1905 Thomas Dixon novel The Clansman. The book depicts Stanton's actions between war's end and Johnson's impeachment, and the role he played in Reconstruction policies. This book was adapted into the film The Birth of a Nation, though Stanton does not feature prominently in the movie.

In the 1930s, a book written by Otto Eisenschiml accused Stanton of arranging the assassination of Lincoln. Although these charges remain largely unsubstantiated, Eisenschim's book inspired considerable debate and the 1977 book and movie, The Lincoln Conspiracy. Stanton was also portrayed negatively in the 1971 TV movie/re-enactment, They've Killed President Lincoln!, narrated by Richard Basehart.

Stanton appears prominently in the alternate history Civil War trilogy by Newt Gingrich and William R. Forstchen.

Stanton has been portrayed on screen numerous times:

- Oscar Apfel – Abraham Lincoln (1930 film)
- Edwin Maxwell – The Plainsman (1936 film)
- Raymond Brown – Lincoln in the White House (1939 short film)
- Richard H. Cutting – The Gun That Won the West (1955 film)
- Roy Gordon – The Great Locomotive Chase (1956 film)
- Harlan Warde – Death Valley Days, episode "The Stolen City" (1961 TV episode)
- Bert Freed – Lincoln (1974 miniseries)
- Robert Middleton – The Lincoln Conspiracy (1977 film)
- Richard Dysart – The Ordeal of Dr. Mudd (1980 film)
- John Rolloff – The Blue and the Gray (1982 miniseries)
- Jon DeVries – Lincoln (1988 miniseries)
- Fred Gwynne – Lincoln (1992 documentary)
- Eddie Jones – The Day Lincoln Was Shot (1998 TV film)
- Jesse Bennett – Touched by an Angel, episode "Beautiful Dreamer" (1998 TV episode)
- Kevin Kline – The Conspirator (2010 film)
- Bernie Ask – Abraham Lincoln vs. Zombies (2012 TV film)
- Bruce McGill – Lincoln (2012 film)
- Graham Beckel – Killing Lincoln (2013 TV film)
- Tobias Menzies – Manhunt (2024 miniseries)

== See also ==
- List of United States political appointments that crossed party lines

== Notes ==
Legal offices
| Preceded by Jeremiah Black | United States Attorney General; 1860–1861 | Succeeded by Edward Bates |
Political offices
| Preceded by Simon Cameron | United States Secretary of War; 1862–1867 | Succeeded by Ulysses S. Grant; Acting |
| Preceded by Ulysses S. Grant; Acting | United States Secretary of War; 1868 | Succeeded by John Schofield |
