= Benjamin P. Thomas =

American historian (1902–1956)

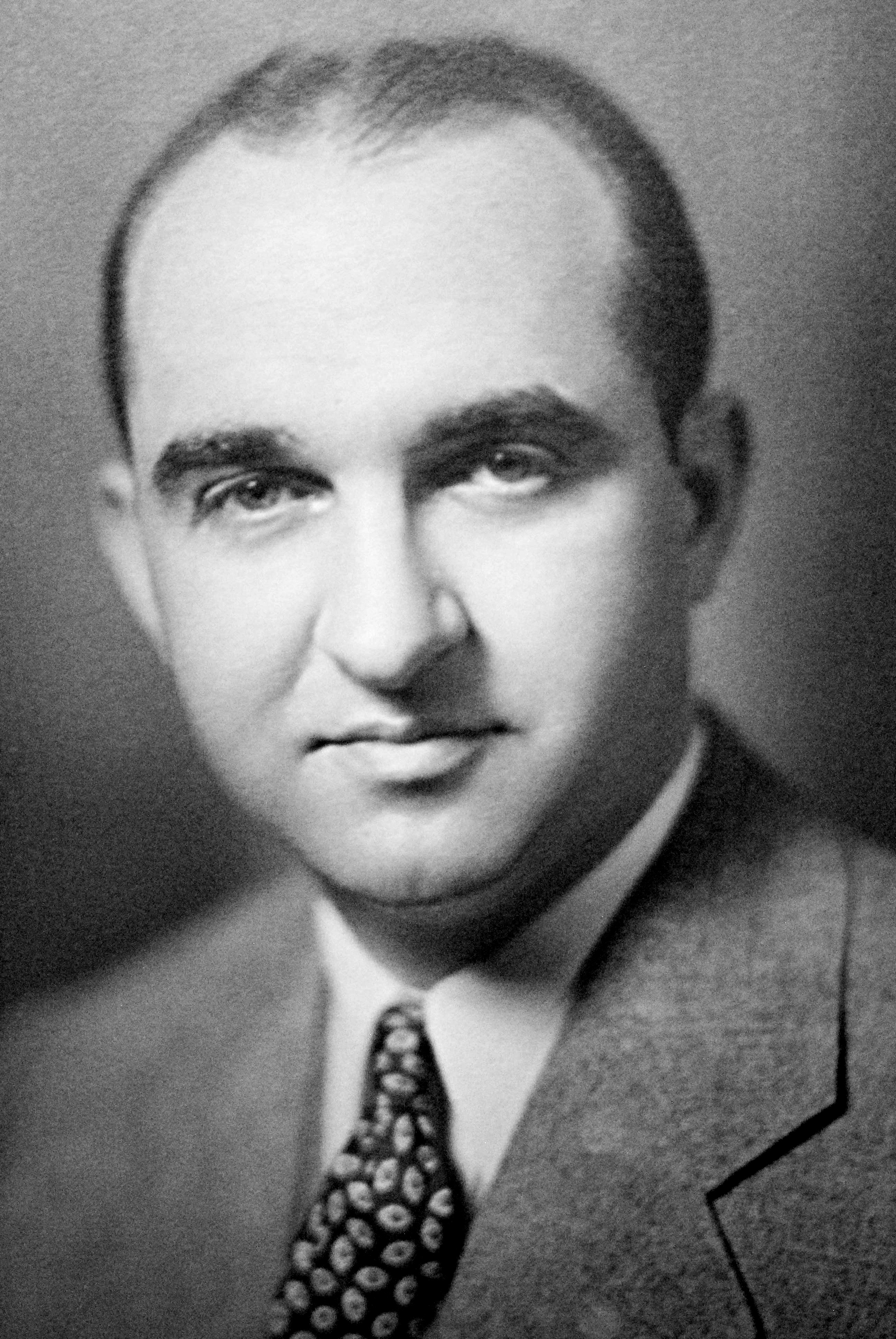
- Born: Benjamin Platt Thomas; February 22, 1902
- Died: November 29, 1956 (aged 54)
- Occupation: Historian
- Notable work: Abraham Lincoln: A Biography

Benjamin Platt Thomas (February 22, 1902 – November 29, 1956) was an American historian and biographer of Abraham Lincoln. In 1952 he published a best-selling one volume biography on Lincoln entitled Abraham Lincoln: A Biography (Knopf, 1952). Thomas killed himself on November 29, 1956.

== Books ==
- "Lincoln's Humor" and Other Essays. Urbana: University of Illinois Press, 2002. (with Michael Burlingame)
- Stanton; The Life and Times of Lincoln's Secretary of War. New York: Knopf, 1962. (with Harold Melvin Hyman)
- Three Years with Grant. New York: Knopf, 1955. (with Sylvanus Cadwallader)
- Abraham Lincoln: A Biography. New York: Knopf, 1952.
- Theodore Weld, Crusader for Freedom. New Brunswick: Rutgers University Press, 1950.
- Portrait for Posterity: Lincoln and His Biographers. New Brunswick [N.J.]: Rutgers University Press, 1947.
- Lincoln, 1847-1853, Being the Day-by-Day Activities of Abraham Lincoln from January 1, 1847 to December 31, 1853. Springfield, Ill: Abraham Lincoln Association, 1936.
- Lincoln's New Salem. Springfield, Ill: Abraham Lincoln Association, 1934.
- Russo-American Relations, 1815-1867. Baltimore: The Johns Hopkins Press, 1930.
