= Harold Hyman =

American historian (1924–2023)

Harold Melvin Hyman (July 24, 1924 – August 6, 2023) was an American historian of the American Civil War and the Reconstruction Era and the William P. Hobby Professor of History at Rice University.

During World War II, Hyman served in the Marines in the South Pacific and there earned his high school diploma. Hyman received a bachelor's degree from the University of California, Los Angeles (1948) and an M.A. (1950) and Ph.D. (1952) from Columbia University.

== Teaching ==
Hyman was an instructor in modern history at City College (1950–1952); assistant professor of history, Earlham College, 1952–1955; visiting assistant professor of American history, UCLA 1955–1956; associate professor of American history, Arizona State University, 1956–1957; professor of history, UCLA 1963–1968; William P. Hobby Professor of History, Rice University, 1968–2003.

== Personal life and death ==
In 1946, Hyman married Ferne Handelsman, later chief reference librarian at Rice. The couple celebrated 65 years of marriage before her death in 2011.

Harold Hyman died on August 6, 2023, at the age of 99.

== Honors and awards ==
Hyman was a Ford Foundation Fellow, a Senior Fulbright Lecturer, an Organization of American Historians Lecturer, and a judge for the Pulitzer Prize and the Littleton-Griswold prize of the American Historical Association.

His Era of the Oath: Northern Loyalty Tests during the Civil War and Reconstruction (1954) won the American Historical Association's Beveridge Award.

== Selected works ==
- Era of the Oath: Northern Loyalty Tests during the Civil War and Reconstruction (University of Pennsylvania Press, 1954, reprinted, Hippocrene Books, 1978).
- To Try Men's Souls: Loyalty Tests in American History, (University of California Press, 1959, reprinted, Greenwood Press, 1981). online
- (With Benjamin P. Thomas) Stanton: The Life and Times of Lincoln's Secretary of War (Knopf, 1962, reprinted, Greenwood Press, 1980). online
- Soldiers and Spruce: The Loyal Legion of Loggers and Lumbermen, the Army's Labor Union of World War I (University of California Press, 1963).
- A More Perfect Union: The Impact of the Civil War and Reconstruction on the Constitution. New York: Knopf. 1973. Archived from the original on 2012-11-02 – via Questia.
- Union and Confidence: The 1860s. Crowell. 1976. Archived from the original on 2008-04-18 – via Questia.
- With Malice toward Some: Scholarship (Or Something Less) on the Lincoln Murder. Abraham Lincoln Association. 1978. Archived from the original on March 8, 2016 – via Questia.
- Equal Justice Under Law: Constitutional Development, 1835-1875 (New American Nation Series) with William Wiecek ISBN 978-0-06-014937-6
- Quiet Past and Stormy Present?: War Powers in American History (American History Association, 1986), pamphlet
- American Singularity: The 1787 Northwest Ordinance, the 1862 Homestead and Morrill Acts, and the 1944 G.I. Bill (University of Georgia Press, 1986). online
- The Reconstruction Justice of Salmon P. Chase: In Re Turner and Texas v. White (University Press of Kansas, 1997).
- Oleander Odyssey: The Kempners of Galveston, Texas, 1854-1980s (Kenneth E. Montague Series in Oil and Business History) ISBN 978-0890964385 (Texas A & M University Press, 1990).
- Craftsmanship and Character: A History of the Vinson & Elkins Law Firm of Houston, 1917-1997 (Studies in the Legal History of the South) ISBN 978-0820319735 (University of Georgia Press, 1998).

Hyman was editor, contributor, or joint author:

- The Radical Republicans and Reconstruction Policy, 1861-1870 (Bobbs- Merrill, 1966), primary sources
- New Frontiers of the American Reconstruction (University of Illinois Press, 1966), scholarly essays
- (With Leonard W. Levy) Freedom and Reform: Essays in Honor of Henry Steele Commager (Harper, 1967).
- (With H. C. Allen and others) Heard 'round the World: The Impact Abroad of the Civil War (Knopf, 1969).
- (author of introduction) Carleton Parker, The Casual Laborer and Other Essays (new edition of 1919 original, University of Washington Press, 1972).
- (author of introduction, with wife, Ferne Hyman) The Circuit Court Opinions of Salmon Portland Chase (new edition of 1875 original, Da Capo Press, 1972).
- (author of introduction) Sidney George Fisher, The Trial of the Constitution (new edition of 1862 original, Da Capo Press, 1972).
- (author of introduction) Edward McPherson, The Political History of the United States of America, During the Great Rebellion, 1860-1865 (new edition of 1864 original, Da Capo, 1972).
- (With Hans L. Trefousse) Edward McPherson, Handbook of Politics, six volumes, new edition of 1894 original, Da Capo, 1972–73.
- (With Hans L. Trefousse) Lincoln's Decision for Emancipation (J. B. Lippincott & Co., 1975) ISBN 0-397-47336-2
- (With Hans L. Trefousse) Edward McPherson, The Political History of the United States of America during the Period of Reconstruction, new edition of 1871 original, Da Capo, 1973.
- (With Kermit L. Hall and Leon V. Sigal) The Constitutional Convention as an Amending Device, American Historical Association/American Political Science Association, 1981.
- Editor, with Stuart Bruchey, of the "American Legal and Constitutional History Series," Garland Publishing, 1986–87.
- Member of board of editors, Reviews in American History, 1964—, Ulysses S. Grant Association, 1968—, American Journal of Legal History, 1970—, and Journal of American History, 1970–74.

== Evaluations ==
Bodenhamer (2012) says, "The best guide to the constitutional changes brought by the Civil War and Reconstruction is Harold Hyman, A More Perfect Union: The Impact of the Civil War and Reconstruction on the Constitution (1973). Mayer (2001) says Hyman, "wrote the definitive work on loyalty tests throughout American history."
