= WSTV (disambiguation) =

WSTV is a radio station (104.9 FM) licensed to Roanoke, Virginia, United States.

WSTV may also refer to:

== Radio stations ==
- WSTV (AM), a defunct radio station (1340 AM) licensed to Steubenville, Ohio, United States
- WFRT-FM, a radio station (103.7 FM) licensed to Frankfort, Kentucky, United States, which used the WSTV-FM call sign from 2008 to 2019
- WNKV (FM), a radio station (103.5 FM) licensed to Burgettstown, Pennsylvania, United States, which used the WSTV-FM call sign from 1947 to 1974

== Television stations ==
- WTOV-TV channel 9, an NBC affiliate in Steubenville, Ohio that originally used the WSTV-TV calls from 1953 to 1979
- BBC World Service Television
