= Jerry Barilla =

American politician

Mayor of Steubenville, Ohio
- Incumbent
- Assumed office January 1, 2018
- Preceded by: Domenick Mucci Jr.

Personal details
- Born: Steubenville, Ohio, US
- Party: Republican
- Education: Kent State University

Jerry Barilla is the mayor of Steubenville, Ohio. He was elected mayor on November 7, 2017.

Barilla attended Steubenville High School and then Kent State University, where he got a degree in education and became a high school teacher. After teaching for four years, Barilla joined his father's appliance business, which became known as Frank & Jerry's Furniture and Appliance Store, in downtown Steubenville in 1969, and later became the owner. Barilla later became the president of Historic Fort Steuben, a non-profit which operates a re-creation of Fort Steuben. Barilla had the idea for the Steubenville Nutcracker Village and helped to start the project. In 2017, Barilla retired and closed his store and filed to run for mayor as a Republican.

Barilla won the November 2017 mayoral election with 63% of the vote, defeating Democrat Frankie DiCarlantonio (27%) and independent Royal Mayo (10%). Barilla became the first new mayor in Steubenville in nearly 26 years, succeeding Domenick Mucci Jr.
