= Holy Trinity Greek Orthodox Church (Steubenville, Ohio) =

- First Methodist Episcopal-Holy Trinity Greek Orthodox Church
- U.S. National Register of Historic Places
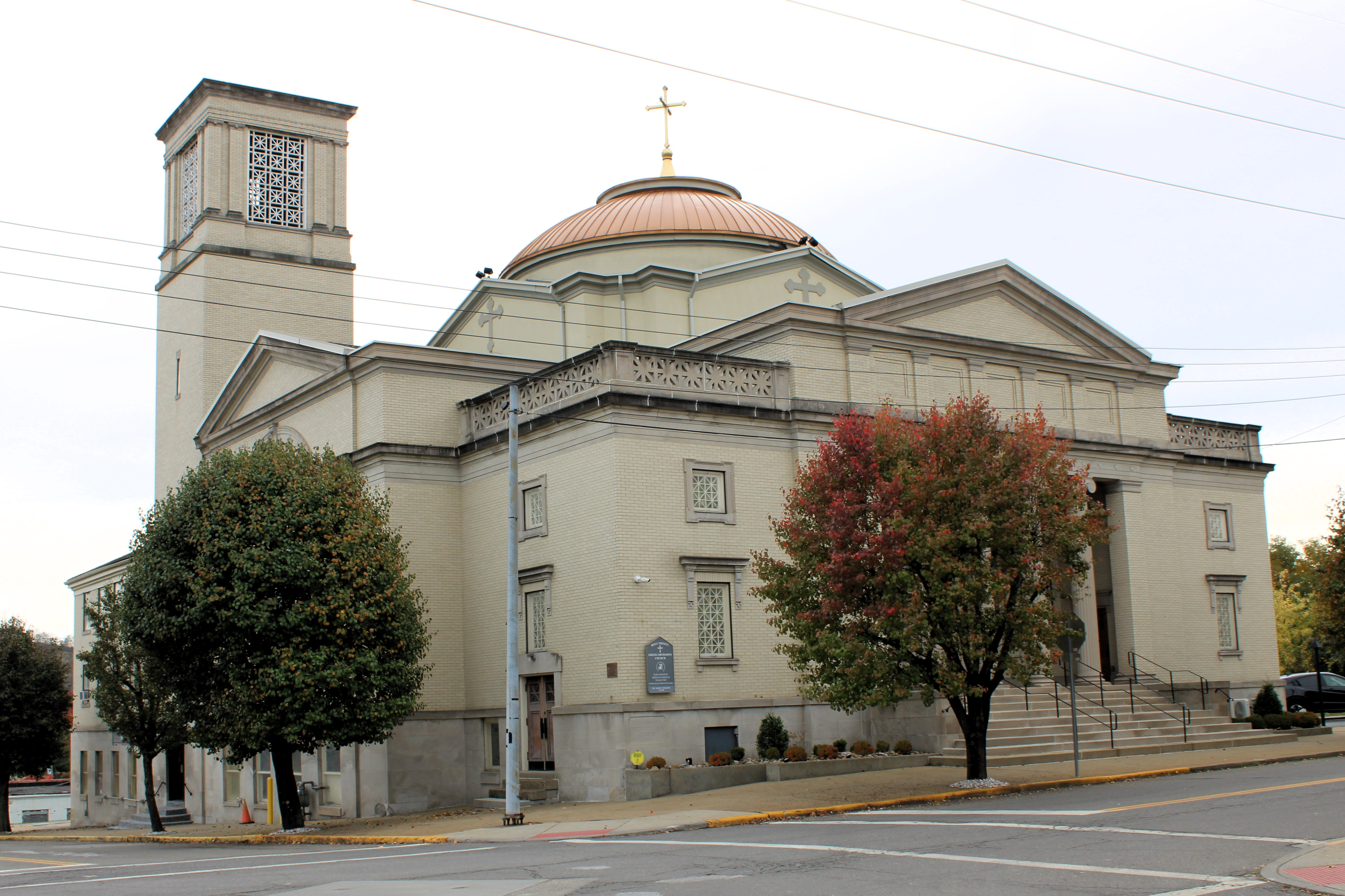
- Front and northern side

- Location within Ohio Location within the United States
- Location: 300 S. Fourth St., Steubenville, Ohio
- Coordinates: 40°21′23″N 80°37′0″W
- Area: 0.3 acres (0.12 ha)
- Built: 1914
- Architectural style: Neoclassical
- NRHP reference No.: 06000093
- Added to NRHP: March 2, 2006

Holy Trinity Greek Orthodox Church is a historic Greek Orthodox church building near downtown Steubenville, Ohio, United States. Constructed for a large Methodist Episcopal congregation in the early twentieth century, it was acquired by the present occupants in 1945. Featuring Neoclassical elements such as a large dome and a prominent colonnade, it has been named a historic site.

== History ==
=== Methodist history ===
The first minister to pass through Jefferson County appears to have been Baptist preacher David Jones, a travelling minister who preached to Indians and scattered settlers during a 1772 visit. Jefferson County's first Methodists were present by the 1780s, appearing in Richard Butler's journal during an expedition to remove squatters from Indian country in 1785. Methodist preachers were active in Steubenville during 1794; a circuit had been formed by 1796, and a separate congregation was formed before long. When Francis Asbury visited Steubenville to preach in 1803, he observed that their usual meeting place, the courthouse, was too small to hold everyone. Several years passed before this problem was resolved; some members formed a separate congregation nearby in 1810, and wealthy member Bezaleel Wells donated land at the corner of Fourth and South Streets in Steubenville upon which a church was ready for use by the end of 1811. Epidemics carried away many in 1813, but the numbers continued to swell as revival meetings won numerous converts, and while the new building was complete by 1814, an expansion was necessary as early as 1821. By 1824, the church was larger than any other in Steubenville, but the coming of New Light preachers caused a split, as the newcomers won away many Methodists. Membership stood at 178 in 1830, but 82 members left during the national schism that produced the Methodist Protestant Church in that year, and an epidemic of scarlet fever killed many younger members in the following year. Nevertheless, the congregation eventually began to regain its strength; the members living in northern Steubenville became a separate congregation in 1845, but eleven years later, the original building was replaced with a larger structure that was expanded in 1871. Further church planting was conducted in 1867 and 1870, but by 1910, membership was approximately 650. Consequently, the present building was constructed on the same site in 1914.

=== Orthodox history ===
The earliest members of the Greek Orthodox faith resident in Steubenville had no church building; some were members of the Holy Trinity parish, which worshipped on the upper floors of commercial buildings, while others crossed the Ohio River to Weirton for worship, even though both the Fort Steuben Bridge and the Market Street Bridge charged tolls at the time. The situation changed in 1945, when Holy Trinity bought the former First Methodist building.

== Architecture ==
Holy Trinity is a composite Neoclassical building; the walls are brick with significant sandstone elements, covered by an asphalt roof and resting on a stone foundation. The main entrance is set in a recessed portico at the center of the facade, accessed by a small flight of steps and sheltered by a colonnade of four Ionic columns. A tall entablature, as high as some of the windows, stands above the columns, while a small pediment sits atop the middle of the entablature. On the side facing South Street, the primary component of the facade is a large gabled section filled with a central arch window and smaller rectangular windows. Corner sections of the building, plus a section extending farther along South, are two stories tall with an exposed basement, and numerous smaller windows pierce the walls on all three floors. A tall square tower, once topped with a cupola, is placed along the South Street side, while a far larger dome covers the central portion of the building.

== Recognition ==
In 2006, Holy Trinity Church was listed on the National Register of Historic Places, qualifying because of its historically significant architecture. It is one of eight National Register-listed locations in the city, along with buildings such as the 1900 Carnegie library one block away, the pioneer-era Steubenville Federal Land Office at Fort Steuben, and the Steubenville Commercial Historic District downtown.
