= Mucci =

Mucci may refer to:

- Albano Mucci (born 1968), Australian activist
- Antonio Mucci (1932–2004), Argentine politician
- Celeste Mucci (1999), Australian athlete
- Cristina Mucci (born 1949), Argentine writer and journalist
- Domenick Mucci Jr. (born 1956), Ohio politician
- Henry Mucci (1909–1997), United States Army Rangers colonel
- Lou Mucci (1909–2000), American jazz trumpeter
- Mara Mucci (born 1982), Italian politician

== See also ==
- Dion DiMucci (born 1939)
