= Thomas Bender =

Thomas or Tom Bender may refer to:

- Tom Bender (footballer) (born 1993), Welsh footballer
- Thomas H. Bender (born 1944), American historian
- Tom Bender (architect) (1941–2020), American architect, early founder of the green architecture and sustainability movements
- Tom Bender (basketball) (1944–2014), Australian basketball player
- Tom Bender (sportscaster) (1925–1995), American sportscaster
