= Joe Tucker (sportscaster) =

Canadian-American radio announcer (1909–1986)

- Born: Joseph George Tucker; December 23, 1909; Hirsch, Saskatchewan, Canada
- Died: July 26, 1986 (aged 76); Pittsburgh, Pennsylvania, U.S.
- Other names: Joseph Tucker, George Joseph Tucker
- Occupations: Radio announcer, sportscaster, radio host, disc jockey, author
- Years active: 1936–1971
- Spouse: Frances Schlesinger (m. 1935; died 1981)
- Children: 3
- Sports commentary career
- Teams: Pittsburgh Steelers, Pittsburgh Panthers, Duquesne Dukes, Pittsburgh Yellow Jackets, Pittsburgh Hornets, Pittsburgh Pirates, Pittsburgh Rens, Pittsburgh Pipers, Pittsburgh Penguins
- Genres: Play-by-play, color commentary
- Sports: Football, basketball, hockey, baseball, boxing, golf, tennis

Joseph George Tucker (December 23, 1909 – July 26, 1986) was a Canadian-American radio and television sportscaster best known as the original Pittsburgh Steelers radio announcer from 1936 to 1967.

== Early life ==
Joe Tucker was born on December 23, 1909, in Hirsch, Saskatchewan, Canada, to a working-class family. He spent the majority of his childhood in Estevan and graduated from Estevan Collegiate Institute in 1928. Soon after, he immigrated to Pittsburgh, PA and became a United States citizen. His brothers and sisters joined him in America afterward. While in Pittsburgh, he held various odd jobs at clothing stores and labor unions before securing a position at the F&S clothing store, where he worked for several years before being hired as a full-time radio broadcaster.

== Career ==
=== Baseball ===
Joe Tucker started his broadcasting career calling Pittsburgh Pirates games in 1936 on WWSW. While he was never the main (play-by-play) commentator or color commentator, he would often substitute for each role when either of the main sports commentators was unavailable. His first two games were a doubleheader between the Pirates and the Philadelphia Phillies in September 1936, with play-by-play announcer Rosey Rowswell joining him for the first game and Tucker calling the second game solo. At the time, all Pirates radio broadcasts were recreations of games made in the studio until the games were broadcast live from the ballpark starting in 1938. Tucker filled in for Rowswell again for two weeks that year and continued to substitute for games as the Pirates' third announcer from 1938 to 1956 on WWSW and KDKA whenever Rowswell or color commentators Jack Craddock and Bob Prince were unavailable. Tucker also hosted the pregame show, "Warm-Up Time with Tucker," and the postgame show, "Star of the Day," for Pirates broadcasts on WWSW and KDKA from 1937 to 1956. He finally called Pirates games alongside Bob Prince and Dick Bingham as the team's second color commentator in 1956.

=== Football ===
From 1936 to 1967, Tucker was the play-by-play announcer for the Pittsburgh Steelers, originally known as the Pittsburgh Pirates football team until 1940. Like the Pirates baseball broadcasts, all football broadcasts were recreations until live broadcasts from the field began in 1938. Tucker originally called the games solo in 1936 and 1937. Famed baseball announcer Russ Hodges briefly joined him for color commentary and commercials in 1938 and 1939 before moving to New York City in the latter year, eventually broadcasting games for the New York Yankees and New York Giants. From 1940 to 1943, Bill Cullen, known for his wit and humor, joined Tucker for color commentary, commercials, and occasionally play-by-play before starting his television career in New York in 1944. Tucker also got his nickname, "Joe the Screamer," after two games in 1940 and 1941 against the Brooklyn Dodgers at Ebbets Field, where he had to scream over the crowds for the radio listeners to hear him. After that, Tucker's color commentators were Jack Craddock from 1944 to 1946, Bob Prince from 1947 to 1956, Charles "Red" Donley from 1955 to 1961, and Tom Bender from 1957 until Tucker's last game on radio in 1964. Tucker and the other announcers called the games on WWSW from 1936 to 1955 and again from 1959 to 1964, while KDKA broadcast the games from 1956 to 1958.

Tucker also called Steelers games on television. His first TV broadcast was a game between the Steelers and the Chicago Cardinals at Comiskey Park on October 28, 1951, on DuMont. While Tucker remained as the Steelers' radio announcer for home games until 1964, he also worked as their TV announcer for away games on DuMont in 1951, NBC in 1952 and 1953, and CBS from 1954 to 1967 while Prince, Donley, or Bender filled in for him on the radio. Longtime West Virginia Mountaineers football and basketball play-by-play announcer Jack Fleming also began calling radio broadcasts for the Steelers in 1957 and eventually replaced Tucker in 1965 as the Steelers' play-by-play announcer for all games, home and away, on KDKA. Joining Joe Tucker as color commentators for TV broadcasts were Joe Bach from 1954 to 1962, John Sauer from 1963 to 1965, Lowell Perry in 1966, and Bill Burns in 1967.

On national NFL broadcasts, Tucker did play-by-play announcing for the 1956 NFL Championship Game on NBC radio and the 1958 Pro Bowl on NBC TV.

After his NFL announcing career ended, Tucker called Pittsburgh Panthers home football games on WWSW in 1968 and WJAS in 1969 with Red Donley and Jack Henry.

=== Hockey ===
Tucker called the radio broadcasts of the third Pittsburgh Yellow Jackets hockey team from 1936 to 1937 and the Pittsburgh Hornets from 1936 to 1956 at the Duquesne Gardens. Unlike his earlier experiences in football and baseball, he announced every game from the press box inside the arena and later separate radio broadcast booths. Color commentators who joined Tucker were Bill Cullen from 1939 to 1943, Jack Craddock from 1943 to 1946, Bob Prince in 1946 and 1947, and Beckley Smith Jr. from 1947 to 1956. WWSW aired the games live from 1936 to 1946, followed by KQV from 1946 to 1956. Joe Tucker also announced the Pittsburgh Penguins' TV broadcasts in 1970 on WPGH-TV, including their Stanley Cup playoff games against the St. Louis Blues in the NHL semifinals.

=== Basketball ===
Tucker announced Duquesne Dukes basketball games from 1936 to 1958 on WWSW and again on WPGH-TV in 1969 and 1970. His broadcasting partners were Rege Cordic from 1943 to 1948 and Bob Prince from 1948 to 1953.

In professional basketball, Tucker did play-by-play for the Pittsburgh Rens in 1961 and 1962 and the Pittsburgh Pipers from 1967 to 1970.

=== Boxing ===
While Tucker was most popular for his work in football, baseball, hockey, and basketball, he also called boxing matches, known as "Friday Night Fights", and interviewed boxers from 1938 to 1949 during his time on WWSW in Pittsburgh. On June 22, 1938, he and over 70,000 fans watched Joe Louis, one of the greatest boxers of all time, defeat Max Schmeling in a rematch and a first-round knockout at the 1938 worldwide heavyweight boxing championship at Yankee Stadium, known as Joe Louis vs. Max Schmeling II. Both Tucker and Louis traveled to Pittsburgh the next day, and Tucker interviewed Joe Louis on WWSW, congratulating him on his victory and discussing Louis' two favorite sports, boxing and softball.

=== Studio work ===
From 1936 to 1968, Tucker was the Sports Director at WWSW, where he broadcast games for all major sports in Pittsburgh, and he also hosted several radio shows from WWSW's studios. His most popular and longest-lasting show was The Sports Parade, which Al Helfer had hosted from 1933 to 1935, and Jack Craddock from 1935 to 1936, when they were the Pittsburgh Pirates' radio announcers. On The Sports Parade, Tucker recapped major sporting events on weekdays and interviewed numerous athletes, including the aforementioned boxer Joe Louis and golfers Byron Nelson and Sam Snead. Tucker also interviewed other famous figures on his shows, such as singer and former Pirates co-owner Bing Crosby and former Pittsburgh mayor David L. Lawrence. Tucker also attended and announced golf and tennis tournaments whenever they came to Pittsburgh.

Tucker also hosted the 1500 Club, an all-night music, news, and guest program, from 1938 to 1940, when Bill Cullen took over. He returned to reporting the news in 1968 and 1969 when he became WWSW's News Director. As News Director, he hosted the show "News Behind the News," which reported national and worldwide events to listeners in Pittsburgh.

== Retirement ==
After two heart attacks forced Tucker to retire in December 1970, he filed for and received approval from Social Security to receive payments based on disability. He also received a pension based on his previous union labor. In October 1971, Tucker and his wife moved to Hallandale Beach, Florida, where they spent time with family and friends playing tennis and golf as he recovered from his past health issues.

Tucker wrote two books detailing the Pittsburgh Steelers' history. The first, Steelers' Victory After Forty, released in 1973, told the story of the Steelers' first forty years as an NFL team, leading up to their first playoff victory with the Immaculate Reception in 1972. The second, Steelers' Super Dynasty, released in 1980, told the story of the Steelers' first four Super Bowl championships. Tucker also planned to release an autobiography while taking many notes of his life experiences.

On September 20, 1981, in a game between the Pittsburgh Steelers and the New York Jets at Three Rivers Stadium in Pittsburgh, Tucker called the Steelers' first offensive drive of the third quarter with Myron Cope on the Pittsburgh Steelers Radio Network, which resulted in a one-yard rushing touchdown by quarterback Terry Bradshaw and a successful extra point by kicker David Trout. The Steelers won the game, 38–10.

In July 1982, Tucker attended the Steelers' training camp at Saint Vincent College in Latrobe, PA. During his visit, a news crew from WTAE-TV interviewed him, and he shared stories about the Steelers' past while also expressing satisfaction with the team's more recent achievements and the improvements in radio broadcasting since his career began. Later that year, Tucker co-hosted the Steelers' 50th anniversary banquet, which featured many Steelers legends including Bill Dudley.

== Personal life ==
Tucker married Frances "Fran" Schlesinger on August 25, 1935, in Pittsburgh, PA. They had one daughter and two sons, including Murray Tucker. Fran passed away from leukemia in 1981. Tucker passed away from complications following cardiac surgery on July 26, 1986. In the 1990s, Murray rediscovered his father's notes, which he published in 2007 as a biography titled Screamer: The Forgotten Voice of the Pittsburgh Steelers.

After Tucker's death, Steelers owner Art Rooney said, 'He was one of the best. Everybody knew him as a broadcaster and as the voice of the Steelers, but much more important than that was that he was one of the finest men you could ever know.'

== Bibliography ==
- Tucker, Joe (1973). Steelers' Victory After Forty. Exposition Press. ISBN 978-0-68247-787-1.
- Tucker, Joe (1980). Steelers' Super Dynasty. Gordon Printing.

== See also ==
- List of Pittsburgh Steelers broadcasters
- List of Pittsburgh Steelers figures in broadcasting
