= WTOV-TV =

Television station in Steubenville, Ohio

- Steubenville, Ohio; Wheeling, West Virginia; United States
- City: Steubenville, Ohio
- Channels: Digital: 9 (VHF); Virtual: 9
- Branding: WTOV 9; News 9; Fox 9 (9.2)

Programming
- Affiliations: 9.1: NBC; 9.2: Fox; for others, see § Subchannels

Ownership
- Owner: Sinclair Broadcast Group; (WTOV Licensee, LLC)

History
- First air date: December 24, 1953
- Former call signs: WSTV-TV (1953–1979)
- Former channel numbers: Analog: 9 (VHF, 1953–2009); Digital: 57 (UHF, 2002–2009)
- Former affiliations: CBS (1953–1980); ABC (secondary 1953–2000, college sports only 2000–2009)
- Call sign meaning: "We're Television for the Ohio Valley"

Technical information
- Licensing authority: FCC
- Facility ID: 74122
- ERP: 30 kW
- HAAT: 282 m (925 ft)
- Transmitter coordinates: 40°20′33.3″N 80°37′13.3″W

Links
- Public license information: Public file; LMS
- Website: wtov9.com

WTOV-TV (channel 9) is a television station licensed to Steubenville, Ohio, United States, serving the Wheeling, West Virginia–Steubenville, Ohio market as an affiliate of NBC and Fox. Owned by Sinclair Broadcast Group, the station maintains studios and transmitter facilities on Burr Avenue in Mingo Junction, Ohio (mailing address reads Red Donley Plaza in Steubenville).

== History ==
The station went on air as WSTV-TV (for Steubenville) on December 24, 1953. It was owned by Rust Craft Broadcasting along with WSTV radio (1340 AM), which went off the air in 2011, and 103.5 FM (now WNKV). When the Federal Communications Commission (FCC) opened bidding for the channel 9 license, Rust Craft and CBS emerged as the favorites. CBS planned to move the station's license to Pittsburgh in order to get its own station in what was then the sixth-largest market. However, the FCC turned CBS' bid down. The major cities in the Upper Ohio Valley are so close together that they must share the VHF band, and the FCC had opted not to issue any more VHF construction permits to Pittsburgh in order to give Wheeling–Steubenville and the other smaller markets in the area a chance to get on the air. The Wheeling–Steubenville TV market, despite its very close proximity to Pittsburgh and overlapping signals, remains a separate market today.

Channel 9 was originally a CBS affiliate, but also carried a secondary affiliation with ABC, sharing that network's programming with NBC affiliate WTRF-TV (channel 7). It changed its call letters to WTOV (standing for "We're Television for the Ohio Valley") on June 1, 1979, after Rust Craft merged with Ziff Davis and sold off the radio stations. The call letters had been previously used for a TV station in Portsmouth, Virginia that is now WGNT. During its time as a CBS affiliate, the station struggled in the ratings due to the presence of Group W powerhouse KDKA-TV (channel 2) in Pittsburgh, which to this day remains widely viewable in the area both over-the-air and available on cable.

The station began phasing out ABC in the 1970s, but continued to carry a few ABC programs in off-hours for many years. Channel 9 had little need to air many ABC shows due to the presence of WTAE-TV (channel 4), Youngstown affiliate WYTV (channel 33), and to a lesser extent Columbus affiliate WTVN-TV (channel 6, now WSYX) on cable systems in the area; WSYX is now a sister station to channel 9.

On January 7, 1980, WTOV swapped affiliations with WTRF and became an NBC affiliate. At the time of the switch, NBC had struggled in the ratings for a number of years and then-market leader WTRF wanted a stronger affiliation. However, in the ensuing years the affiliation switch began to benefit WTOV. For starters, instead of competing with KDKA-TV for network programming from the nearby Pittsburgh market, WTOV now competed with future sister station WIIC-TV, channel 11 (which became WPXI the following year), which, until recently, had been one of NBC's weakest major-market affiliates. Secondly, NBC as a whole began to improve in the ratings in the early 1980s, and by the middle of the decade, was America's most-watched network, while CBS went through a serious decline that the network would not recover from until the late 1990s. The affiliation with NBC also gave the station rights to carry the majority of Steelers games via the NFL on NBC package until 1997, and since 2006 a few games per year via NBC's Sunday Night Football, allowing it a good opportunity to establish itself with viewers (the station is within the 75-mile (121 km) NFL blackout contour, though the Steelers have never had a blackout since the current NFL blackout policy went into effect). These factors led WTOV-TV to surpass WTRF-TV in the ratings in the Wheeling–Steubenville market, a position it now holds by a wide margin.

In 1983, Ziff Davis sold WTOV, along with then-sister stations WEYI-TV in Saginaw, Michigan, WRDW-TV in Augusta, Georgia, and WROC-TV in Rochester, New York, to Television Station Partners, L.P. Under the new ownership, channel 9 was the last NBC affiliate known to have used the old "Proud N" in its branding, keeping it for two years after NBC adopted its current simplified peacock logo in 1986. WTOV, along with WEYI and WROC, were sold to Smith Broadcast Group in 1996. In 2000, Cox Enterprises acquired WTOV, along with fellow NBC affiliate WJAC-TV in Johnstown, Pennsylvania, on the other side of the Pittsburgh market, from Sunrise/STC Broadcasting (one of several subsidiaries of Smith Broadcasting). The station dropped the remaining ABC shows from its schedule soon after Cox took over. It also updated its logo to resemble that of sister station WPXI in Pittsburgh, and along with WJAC, the three were occasionally marketed together as a result until WPXI revamped its news graphics and music package.

WTOV's broadcasts became digital-only, effective June 12, 2009.

The station airs tape-delayed high school football games of the week including numerous playoff games of local teams and Wheeling Nailers hockey games (at one point preempting a Manchester United–Chelsea Premier League game in 2014, to the ire of local viewers). On June 3, 2010, Dish Network added WTOV, along with PBS member station WOUC and CBS affiliate WTRF (and the latter station's digital subchannels) as the local stations available to its subscribers in the Steubenville–Wheeling market. WTOV and the other Steubenville–Wheeling area television stations were added to DirecTV on November 23, 2010.

On July 20, 2012, one day after Cox purchased four television stations in Jacksonville, Florida, and Tulsa, Oklahoma, from Newport Television, Cox put WTOV-TV, WJAC-TV, and sister stations in El Paso, Texas, and Reno, Nevada (all in markets that are smaller than Tulsa), plus several radio stations in medium to small markets, on the selling block. On February 25, 2013, Cox announced that it would sell the four television stations to Sinclair Broadcast Group. The FCC granted its approval of the sale on April 29, and the deal was consummated on May 2. The deal made WTOV-TV a sister station to Pittsburgh's Fox affiliate WPGH-TV and MyNetworkTV affiliate WPMY, though it is still connected to WPXI through a news-share agreement WPXI has had with WPGH-TV since 2006.

On July 11, 2014, it was announced that WTOV would add Fox programming to its subchannel on September 1, which will serve as the Steubenville–Wheeling area's Fox affiliate, replacing the second digital subchannel of WTRF-TV. In a statement, Fox stated that it switched stations because WTOV has a stronger over-the-air signal than WTRF. Fox programming began broadcasting on September 1, replacing MeTV, which moved to a newly created subchannel. MeTV, whose affiliation dated from Cox's ownership of WTOV, was dropped altogether on September 1, 2022, in favor of Sinclair's own Comet.

WTOV's signal can be reached as far north as Sharon, Pennsylvania, as far west as Coshocton, as far east as Greensburg, Pennsylvania and as far south as Sistersville, West Virginia. Although the area is much better served by fellow NBC affiliate WPXI, WTOV's signal can easily be picked up in higher-elevated areas of the city of Pittsburgh with only a "rabbit-ear" antenna. WTOV is also carried on many cable systems that fall outside of its broadcast signal in northern West Virginia, western Pennsylvania, and east-central Ohio.

== News operation ==
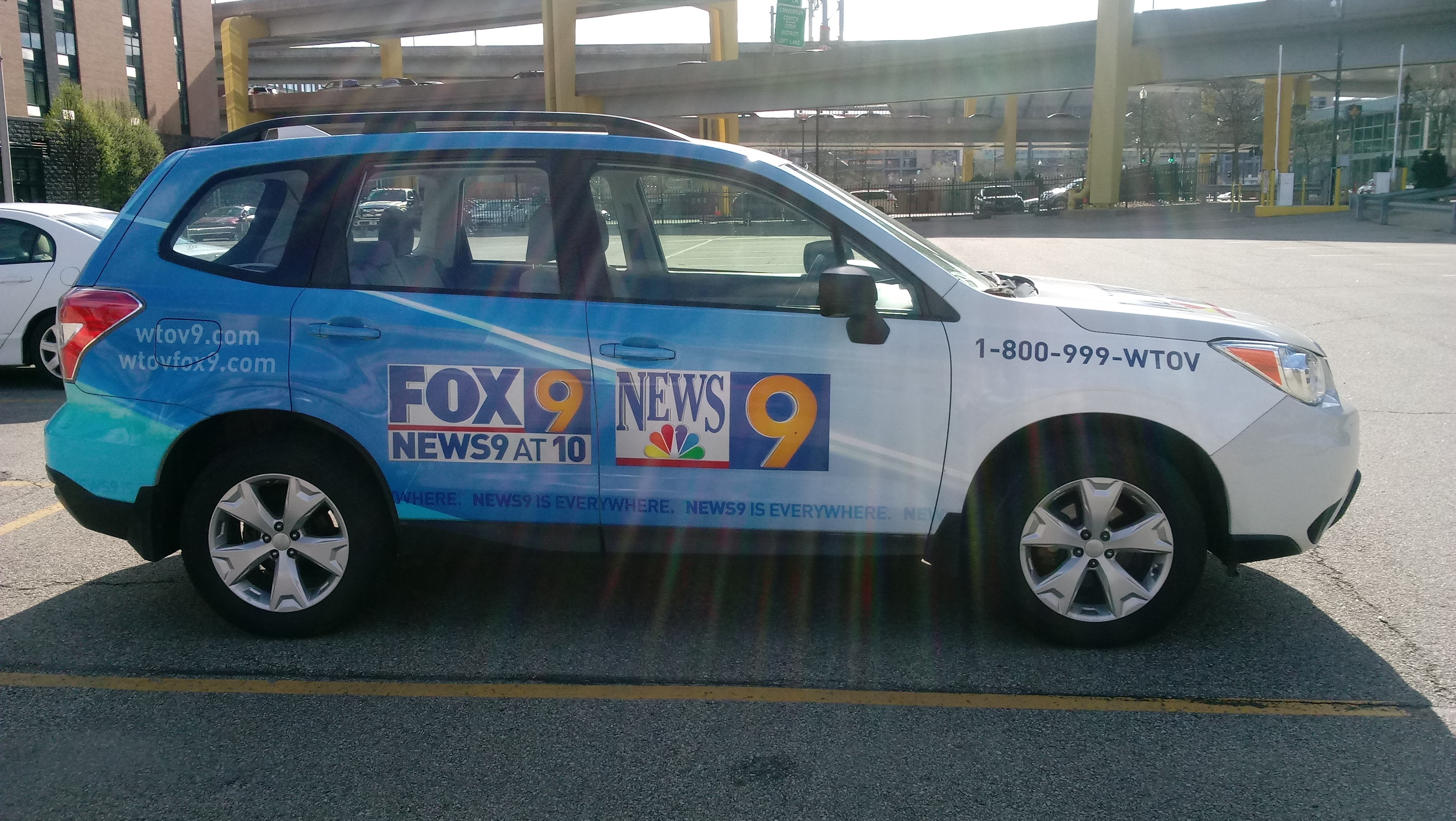
WTOV's news truck, a Subaru Forester, seen in nearby Pittsburgh.

As of 2026, WTOV presently broadcasts 24 1/2 hours of locally produced newscasts each week (with 4 1/2 hours each weekday, three hours on Saturdays, and an hour on Sundays). The station also broadcasts 21 hours of locally produced newscasts each week for its Fox subchannel (with five hours each weekday and 30 minutes each on Saturdays and Sundays).

WTOV was the first station in the Ohio Valley to broadcast its local newscasts in 16:9 widescreen enhanced definition in April 2009, and it currently runs almost all of its syndicated programming in HD (rival WTRF launched the first high-definition newscast in the market on December 29, 2011, during its noon newscast). When WTOV converted its newscasts to the 16:9 widescreen format, the graphics and set got a slight upgrade to match the 16:9 aspect ratio, though the weather graphics were not upgraded until August 2010.

On October 27, 2010, during the noon newscast, WTOV unveiled a new HD-ready set similar to that used by sister stations WPXI/Pittsburgh and WJAC/Johnstown, among other Cox-owned stations. The station's former graphics were launched in 2000, when Cox Enterprises bought WTOV and WJAC. With the new set and graphics, the station flipped its news theme to 615 Music's "The Tower", ending a nine-year run of using that same company's "Total Coverage" news music package. Sister station WJAC followed suit on October 25, 2011.

As part of its upgrade, the station launched "Early Warning Live Doppler 9" using Doppler weather radar data from five National Weather Service radar sites in the region. The station also updated master control to allow for weather warnings and news crawls without down-converting 16:9 video on the main signal to the 4:3 picture format.

On January 8, 2011, WTOV launched an hour-long Saturday morning newscast. On March 21, 2011, WTOV expanded its early evening newscast to a 90-minute block from 5 to 6:30 p.m. The extra half-hour replaced syndicated reruns of Seinfeld, which aired on the station for 15 years (that series would air on cable-only CW Plus affiliate "WBWO" from 2011 to 2021).

In announcing WTOV's Fox subchannel, Sinclair stated that it would carry an hour-long, WTOV-produced 10 p.m. newscast which debuted on October 6, 2014. In addition, WTOV flipped its graphics and news package to the Sinclair News Package. WJAC followed suit in 2016.

=== Notable former on-air staff ===
- Charles "Red" Donley – news reporter, sports reporter, later director (retired in 1988); the WTOV studios are named after him in his honor
- Cindy Hsu – general assignment reporter (1989–1991)
- Fred McLeod – sports anchor (1974–1976)
- Gary Papa – sports anchor (1976–1978)

== Subchannels ==
The station's signal is multiplexed:

Subchannels of WTOV-TV
Channel	Res.	Short name	Programming
9.1	1080i	NBC	NBC
9.2	720p	FOX	Fox
9.3	480i	Charge!	Charge!
9.4	480i	Comet	Comet
