= WSTV (AM) =

Radio station in Steubenville, Ohio (1940–2011)

- Steubenville, Ohio; United States
- Broadcast area: Northern Ohio Valley
- Frequency: 1340 kHz

Ownership
- Owner: Keymarket Communications; (Keymarket Licenses, LLC)

History
- First air date: November 4, 1940
- Last air date: December 5, 2011
- Former call signs: WSTV (1940–2012)
- Call sign meaning: Steubenville

Technical information
- Facility ID: 65407
- Class: C
- Power: 1,000 watts (day and night)
- Transmitter coordinates: 40°20′30.2″N 80°37′7.3″W

WSTV (1340 AM) was an American broadcast radio station licensed to Steubenville, Ohio, serving the Northern Ohio Valley. The station was owned and operated by Keymarket Communications and the broadcast license was held by Keymarket Licenses, LLC. Due to a dispute in regard to the land where the broadcast tower is located, the station was forced to go silent on December 5, 2011.

== History ==
Signed on in 1940, WSTV was founded by Valley Broadcasting Company. It later added sister stations WSTV-FM (103.5 FM, now WNKV) in 1947 and WSTV-TV (channel 9, now WTOV-TV) in 1953. When WSTV went on the air it was a part of the Mutual Broadcasting System and a member of the Friendly Group, an alliance of four radio stations in Steubenville, Pittsburgh, Atlantic City, and Kingston, New York.

In the spring of 1945 WSTV started the Steubenville Radio Forum moderated by A. Robert Anderson, then pastor of the 5th Street Methodist Church. On October 21, 1946, during that program, local news editor Harry Cochran delivered an editorial that sparked the greatest transformation in the history of Steubenville. At the time crime in the city was rampant; corruption among elected officials was expected. Because of the officials' corruption, unchecked crime, and open displays of vice, Steubenville had taken on the reputation and name of "Little Chicago". Cochran decided that he had had enough and declared on air, "It's time for a rat extermination campaign in Steubenville." An association of 12 ministers agreed, banded together, and proceeded to stamp out prostitution, gambling, and official corruption. For their involvement in the effort, WSTV won a plaque and special recognition from Variety for displaying "responsibility to the community". The role WSTV played in the effort is mentioned in the book entitled "Twelve Against The Underworld." by Norman E. Nygaard.

In 1963, Jack Berkman merged his growing broadcasting companies with the Rust Craft Greeting Card Company to form Rust Craft Broadcasting. This company would be folded into Berkman's The Associated Group as Associated Radio, Inc., in the 1970s. In June 1999, The Associated Group was acquired by Liberty Media for $3 billion. Liberty Media was not interested in over-the-air broadcasting so WSTV and three sister stations were sold effective March 2000 to Keymarket Communications through its Keymarket Licenses subsudiary.

In its 71 years of broadcasting, WSTV aired a variety of music, information, and talk radio formats with a focus on the local community. WSTV's news team covered a number of historic moments, including the Attack on Pearl Harbor and the Assassination of John F. Kennedy. At the time the station signed off the air, WSTV aired a sports talk format, airing the feed from ESPN Radio, simulcast with sister station WOMP.

=== Going silent ===
Due to Keymarket being delinquent on taxes for the property on Altamont Hill outside Steubenville where WSTV's transmitting tower sits, the land was foreclosed and sold to another party in 2006. WTRF-TV reported the station's owners "were at odds" with the current property owner.

As a result of the land dispute, WSTV signed off the air on December 5, 2011, with its last programming being those of ESPN Radio. An unnamed employee at Keymarket Communications told Radio Info that "the station has gone dark and will no longer be broadcasting". Keymarket Communications subsequently filed a request with the FCC for special temporary authority to remain silent, to allow them time to settle the dispute.

Steubenville Mayor Domenick Mucci called the station's signing off "a sad day not only for the city of Steubenville, but, really, for the Ohio Valley". Mucci said the station will "be sadly missed". Former WSTV general manager Bill Chesson said, "Hearing that the station has closed is like losing a child."

On November 19, 2012, Keymarket surrendered the station's license to the Federal Communications Commission (FCC). On December 11, 2012, the FCC cancelled WSTV's license and deleted the call sign from its database.

== Notable alumni ==
- Charles "Red" Donley, the announcer for the Pittsburgh Steelers from 1955 to 1961 and "The Voice" of the Pitt Panthers from 1961 to 1970, started his 41-year broadcasting career as a sports commentator on WSTV. In 1970, he returned to WSTV as news director until his retirement in 1988. Donley died in 1998.
- Tom Abernethy, Creator and Host of WSTV AM Phone Party and morning disc jockey from 6 a.m. to 9 a.m. Abernethy began his career at WSTV in 1959. He served as morning host from 1978 to 1999.
- Marshall Fatkin, radio personality
- Scott McMurray, radio news personality also worked for WSTV-TV
- Bill Chesson, sports reporter and co-host with Sue Chesson of "Nighline Live". The show was broadcast from the couple's living room.
- Gene Stabile, sports reporter, color commentator, later host of Phone Party and "You're On" from 9 a.m. to Noon.
- Charles Calabrese, afternoon news anchor of Evening Edition and movie and theater critic "Was It Good? Was It Bad?" Calabrese had previously worked for competitor WEIR in Weirton, West Virginia. Calabrese died on March 29, 2021.
- Wendy Vogel, Morning News Anchor of Morning Edition. Also crossed over as morning news anchor on WRKY & WOGH Froggy Radio. Also known as Wendy Green on WOGH Morning Show.
- Mike Donovan, Afternoon disc jockey until the station went all talk in the early 1990s. Host of "Open Mike" 3 p.m. to 6 p.m.
- Dave Elias, Began his career at WSTV Radio as a reporter and weekend anchor. Later Host of "The Voice of the Valley" replacing "Open Mike. In 1995 became Associate News Director and anchored weekday afternoon news on WSTV/WRKY and WOMP during a simulcast. Elias also was heard as a fill in morning news anchor with Johnny-O on WOMP FM 100.5 show in the mid 90s. He often reported for KQV in Pittsburgh as an Ohio field based reporter. Elias later moved to WTRF TV as a reporter and anchor before leaving the Ohio Valley and moving to Fort Myers Florida where he spent two years as an Investigative Reporter for NBC-2 News and was eventually promoted to the stations Chief Political Correspondent and named by The Washington Post in 2020 as outstanding political reporter to follow.
- Marjie DeFede, previously worked at WEIR, WWVA and in 2000 assumed the role of News Director for The Ohio Valley News Center which provided news for several area radio stations owned by the company.
- Dale Willman, news anchor in the mid-1970s when WSTV ran NBC's all-news programming, called News and Information Service. When that service collapsed, he became the morning music announcer. Later Willman served as a newscaster, producer and program anchor for National Public Radio, also anchoring hourly newscasts from London during the first Gulf War. He also served as the anchor for the now-defunct Monitor Radio morning program.
