= Jefferson County Courthouse (Ohio) =

Local government building in the United States

The Jefferson County Courthouse
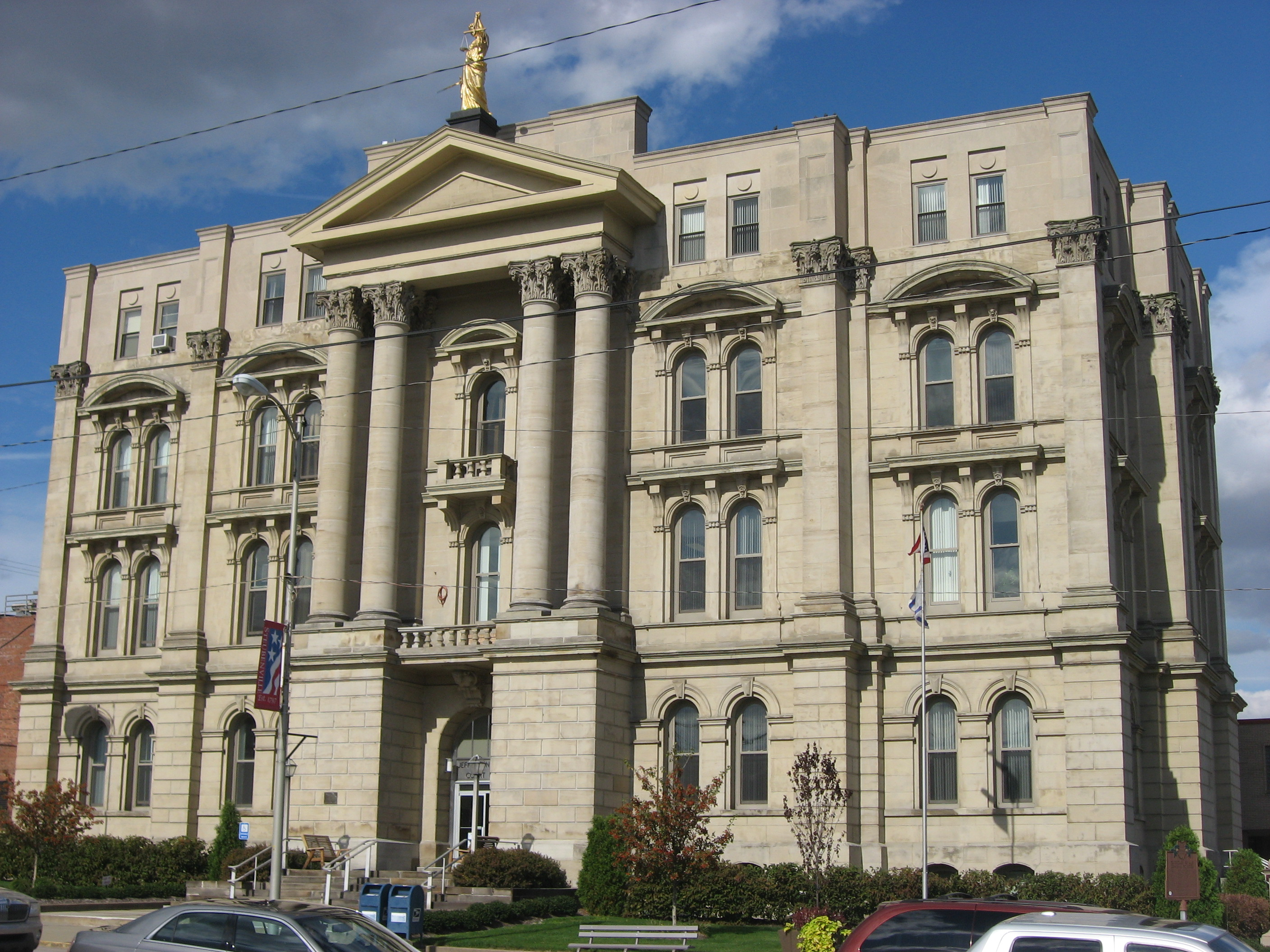
- Front of the courthouse
- Interactive map of the The Jefferson County Courthouse area

General information
- Architectural style: Greek Revival
- Location: Steubenville, Ohio, United States
- Coordinates: 40°21′36″N 80°36′50″W
- Construction started: 1871
- Completed: 1874
- Cost: $
- Client: Jefferson County Commissioners

Design and construction
- Architects: The Firm of Heard & Blythe

The Jefferson County Courthouse is located at 301 Market Street in Steubenville, Ohio. It is the original courthouse constructed for Jefferson County. It was constructed in 1871 through 1874 by Heard & Blythe architectural firm.

== Exterior ==
The courthouse was originally designed and built with four floors, high arched windows with hood-moulds and keystones, sectional Corinthian columns, and a flight of stairs to each entrance. Above the entrances are high Corinthian columns supporting a pediment. The main entrance has Justice standing on the peak of the pediment. The mansard roof contained dormer windows with a central tower capped with a mansard roof.

The sandstone building is severely discolored due to the polluted air from the surrounding steel factories and heavy traffic. In 1950 during a ferocious snowstorm, the top floor collapsed, destroying the ornate roof and tower. Instead of reconstructing the mansard roof and tower, the county officials decided to keep the roof flat.

== Grounds ==
The courthouse stands diagonal from the site of Fort Steuben. A plaque to the left of the main entrance is in memoriam to the USS Maine (ACR-1) and is made from metal recovered from the ship. In front of the courthouse is a statue of Stuebenville native Edwin McMasters Stanton, United States Secretary of War to President Abraham Lincoln.
