= Tom Bender (sportscaster) =

American sportscaster (1925–1995)

- Born: Thomas William Bender, Jr. January 8, 1925; Lilly, Pennsylvania, U.S.
- Died: January 29, 1995 (aged 70); Fort Myers, Florida, U.S.
- Other name: Thomas Bender
- Occupations: Radio announcer, sportscaster, radio host, radio personality
- Years active: 1946–1995
- Spouse: Marjorie Beiter (m. 1951)
- Children: 6
- Sports commentary career
- Teams: Pittsburgh Panthers, Pittsburgh Pirates, Pittsburgh Steelers, Penn State Nittany Lions, Duquesne Dukes
- Genres: Play-by-play, color commentary
- Sports: Football, baseball, basketball, golf

Thomas William Bender Jr. (January 8, 1925 – January 29, 1995) was an American radio and television sportscaster known for his work as a play-by-play announcer and color commentator for the Penn State Nittany Lions and the Pittsburgh Steelers. He was also a radio and TV host for KDKA (AM), KDKA-TV, WTAE (AM), and WTAE-TV.

== Early life ==
Tom Bender was born on January 8, 1925, in Lilly, Pennsylvania. His father, Thomas William Bender Sr., was a World War I U.S. Army veteran. After graduating from Harrisburg High School in 1943, Bender served in the U.S. Navy during World War II and remained in the Navy until 1946. He graduated with a bachelor's degree from Mount St. Mary's University.

== Broadcasting career ==
=== Pittsburgh Panthers ===
After several broadcasting gigs in Pennsylvania, Georgia, and South Carolina throughout the 1940s and 1950s, KDKA hired Bender in 1955 as their full-time sports director to host several sports talk shows and cover Pittsburgh sporting events on KDKA (AM) and KDKA-TV. With this new job opportunity, Bender called Pittsburgh Panthers football as their play-by-play announcer in 1956 with color commentators Dick Cassiano and Bill Sutherland.

=== Pittsburgh Pirates ===
Bender also worked as an announcer for the Pittsburgh Pirates on KDKA from 1957 to 1970. Although he never called the games, he hosted the pregame and postgame shows with Bob Prince and interviewed the players. Bender also hosted a doubleheader show, "Tom Bender's Pirate Dugout," featuring more Pirates interviews. In addition to the game interviews, Bender conducted interviews with Pirates general manager Joe L. Brown on "The Joe L. Brown Show." When the Pirates played and won the 1960 World Series, Bender hosted the pregame show, "Series Special," and the postgame show, "Series Today" on KDKA, where he interviewed the World Series champions.

Bender also did play-by-play for various exhibition games featuring then-current and former Pirates, as well as for the local Pittsburgh media and press.

=== Pittsburgh Steelers ===
Bender began working with the Pittsburgh Steelers as a color commentator on KDKA in 1957, joining play-by-play announcers Joe Tucker and Red Donley. From 1964 to 1969, Bender broadcast Steelers games with play-by-play announcer Jack Fleming. From 1970 to 1973, Bender and Fleming announced the games with famed journalist and radio personality Myron Cope on WTAE.

In 1969, Bender hosted "The Chuck Noll Show", where he conducted interviews with Steelers head coach Chuck Noll on KDKA. From 1970 to 1973, he hosted "Tom Bender Sports" on WTAE, a daily weekday evening sports talk show that was WTAE's first, featuring guests such as Steelers quarterback Terry Bradshaw and pro wrestler Bruno Sammartino. He won the Sigma Delta Chi Award in 1972 for Best Sports Show and Pittsburgh's Golden Quill Award in 1973. Later that year, WTAE laid off Bender, and Myron Cope took over for the Pittsburgh Steelers games and WTAE's sports talk show, which was renamed "Myron Cope on Sports" and ran until 1995, when Bill Hillgrove took over.

Bender rejoined the Steelers' radio broadcast team in 1979 for the team's 35–31 Super Bowl XIII victory, calling Lynn Swann's game-sealing touchdown with Jack Fleming and staying through the postgame show.

=== Penn State Nittany Lions ===
Bender announced Penn State Nittany Lions football games on WMAJ and KDKA as a color commentator from 1959 to 1961 with Mickey Bergstein on play-by-play in 1959 and Gene Kelly on play-by-play in 1960 and 1961. In 1962, the Penn State radio network promoted him to play-by-play announcer, with Randy Hall as color commentator. Mickey Bergstein joined Bender on color commentary from 1963 to 1966, followed by Fran Fisher from 1966 to 1969. As announcer, Bender notably called the Nittany Lions' victories in the 1959 Liberty Bowl, the 1960 Liberty Bowl, the 1961 Gator Bowl, the 1967 Gator Bowl, the 1969 Orange Bowl, and the 1970 Orange Bowl. After Penn State won the 1970 Orange Bowl, Bender attended a celebratory dinner for the team. Fran Fisher became the play-by-play announcer later that year with Jim Tarman at color commentator after Bender left for WTAE.

=== Duquesne Dukes ===
Bender briefly broadcast Duquesne Dukes men's basketball games with color commentator Charlie Hinkle on KDKA from 1963 to 1966.

=== Other work ===
Bender's work as a radio announcer led him to participate in charity events in Pittsburgh for numerous organizations and hospitals. He announced the Dapper Dan Charities golf tournament and the UPMC Children's Hospital of Pittsburgh benefit basketball games during his time on KDKA.

When not on the radio or TV, Bender occasionally served as an emcee for numerous dinner parties and events in the Pittsburgh area, where he shared humorous stories with the audiences.

=== Florida ===
In May 1974, Bender moved to Fort Myers, Florida, where he joined WINK-TV as its sports director and covered the Fort Myers Green Wave high school teams until 1976, when sports reporter Craig Sager served as sports director until 1978. WINK-TV promoted him to news director in 1976, a role he held until his retirement in 1992 while continuing sports commentaries and occasionally filling in as sports director. He also served as the station's community relations director until 1992. He ran a dog racing track from 1992 to 1995. Various fans and friends also moved to Fort Myers, including his friend and coworker at KDKA, Art Pallan, in 1985.

== Personal life ==
Tom Bender and his wife, Marjorie Bender (née Beiter), married on May 5, 1951, in New Cumberland, Pennsylvania. They had three daughters, three sons, and four grandchildren. Family, friends, and coworkers described Bender as a professional, hardworking family man with a good sense of humor and a fun personality.

Bender died on January 29, 1995, in Fort Myers, Florida.

== See also ==
- List of Pittsburgh Steelers broadcasters
- List of Pittsburgh Steelers figures in broadcasting
