= Schiappa Branch Library =

Library in Steubenville, Ohio, United States

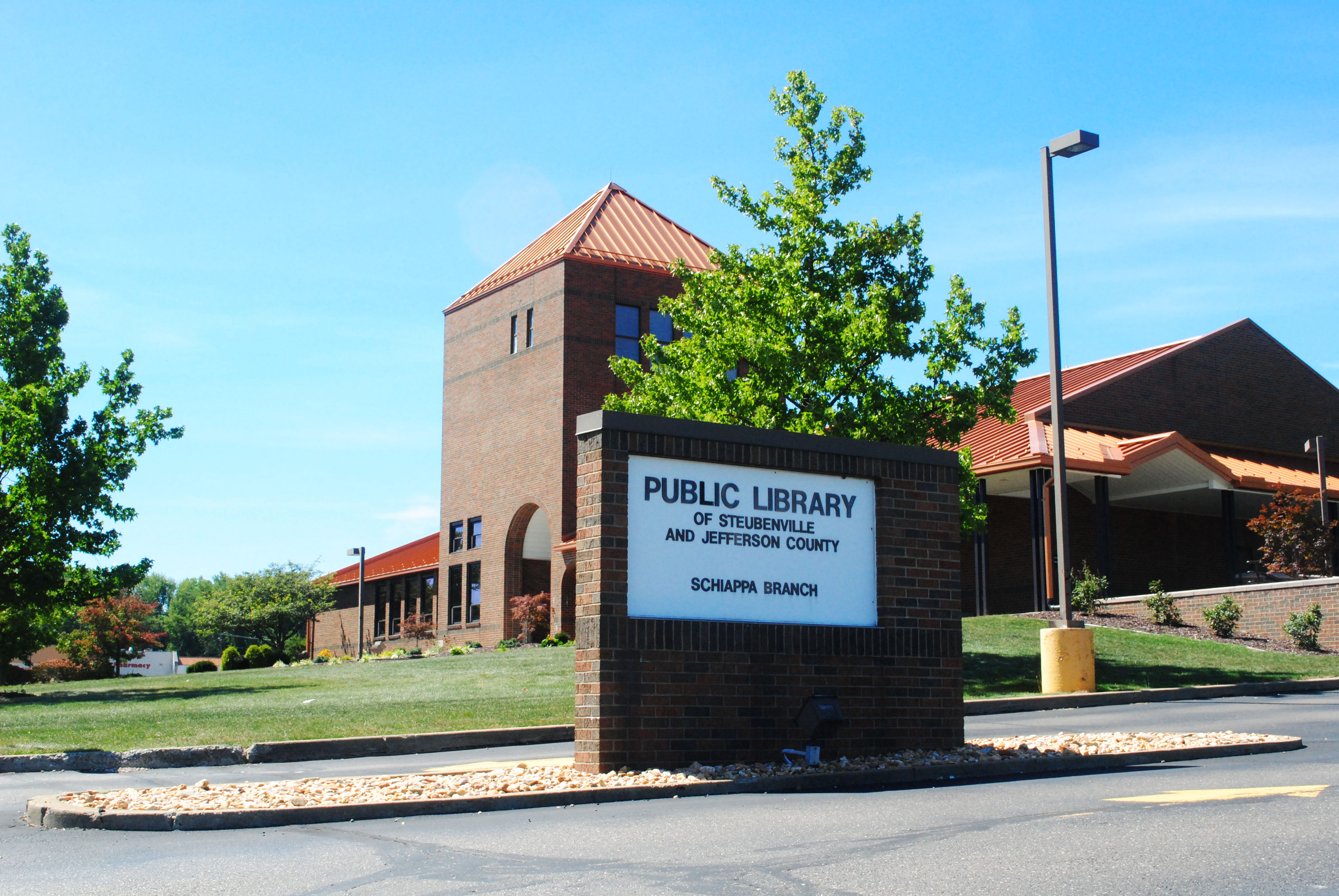
- 40°22′13″N 80°40′24″W
- Location: Steubenville, Ohio
- Established: February 2, 1987
- Branch of: Public Library of Steubenville and Jefferson County

Other information
- Director: Alan Hall
- Employees: 30
- Website: http://www.steubenvillelibrary.org/

The Schiappa Library is a public library located in Steubenville, Ohio. It is a branch of the Public Library of Steubenville and Jefferson County (PLSJ), which services a large area in southeast Ohio – otherwise known as the Ohio Valley. Besides the Schiappa Library, PLSJ has branches all over Jefferson County, Ohio located in Toronto, Brilliant, Tiltonsville, Dillonvale and Adena with the Main Library located in Steubenville. The Schiappa branch is located at the west end of Steubenville on the Fort Steuben Mall property. It not only serves as an additional library for the city of Steubenville, but also as a library for the neighboring village of Wintersville, Ohio.

== History ==
The Schiappa Branch Library opened its doors on February 2, 1987 in the west end of Steubenville, at 4141 Mall Drive, where it still sits on property donated by the Siciliano family. This plot of land was one of many looked at in the time leading up to a final decision, but it was this area's location, being adjacent to a large shopping center attracting people from all over the Ohio Valley, that made it so desirable. Huberta Siciliano made it clear that if she were to donate the land to the library, she would like the facility to be named after her parents: Albert and Mary A. Schiappa.

One concern with the property that the Schiappa Library now sits upon was that the land was a former strip-mining area. This caused many to note that the foundation would be in danger of cracking and heaving once the pyrites swelled with moisture. To resolve this, the library was built upon 110 concrete pylons, drilled into solid rock, which is between 4 and 14 feet deep at the site.

When the library first opened, most shelves had very few books on them and it often seemed like everything was checked out. To remedy this, returned books were shelved quickly and the State Regional Library sent over boxes of books to make the shelves more full temporarily. Over the years, the collection of books has grown exponentially to include videotapes, DVDs, CDs, audiobooks, periodicals, and graphic novels.

== Renovations ==
By 1990, the collection at Schiappa Branch Library had grown so large that talk of expanding the building had begun. A larger children's area was needed, more reference shelving would be required, and the collection in Schiappa's Ohio History and Genealogy room was beginning to take up more space than the shelves could fit. There was also talk of adding a conference room, a children's activity room, and offices for the branch manager. The project went forward in 1992 and the library was renovated with all of the above changes while the building itself stayed open to the public. An extra wing was added for the children's area and activity room, a conference room and three study rooms were built, offices for the branch manager and extra workspaces were added behind the Circulation desk, and the Reference and Genealogy departments were given their own closed in space for quiet studying and for keeping reference materials from leaving the room.

Beginning in 2007, plans were drawn up for another renovation project. This time, it was the front lobby and adult fiction/nonfiction areas that would be getting a makeover. New flooring was put into the front lobby and periodical section. New furniture was brought in, including new desks, workspaces, chairs and a counter for the Circulation department. Vending machines were added beside new study areas for a more modern and customer friendly look. The project was essentially complete in spring of 2008.

== Departments ==
=== General circulation ===
The circulation department is located in the front lobby of the library. Items may be returned or taken out at the circulation desk. Borrowers may also pick up items that have been placed on hold (brought in from other libraries). The library assistants at Circulation will help patrons locate items throughout the building or assist in ordering items that are not currently stocked. A borrower may also take care of any pending overdue fines in this department.

=== Children/teens ===
Located in the rear of the Schiappa Library, this area includes a listening center for audio books, toys for young ones, couches for parents, a youthful reading area for teens and several desks for studying and activities. There is also an activity room used for hosting children's programming and large group activities.

=== References ===
The reference department is mostly for quiet study and Internet usage. The room is equipped with eight computers wired to the Internet. The computers use timed software to allow each borrower up to an hour and twenty minutes of Internet time each day. The reference staff will assist in technical support, troubleshooting, and will answer questions both in person and online through the Meebo chat service. The reference librarian will also assist in ordering material not currently in the libraries database.

=== Ohio Room/genealogy ===
The Ohio History/Genealogy department is unique to the Schiappa Branch Library. Nowhere else in the Jefferson County library system will one find this information. The room is filled with books not only helping with basic genealogy techniques, but also books specific to the Steubenville and Jefferson County region that the library serves. The collection consists of birth, death and marriage records, newspaper clippings, photo albums, high school yearbooks, and United States census materials, among other things. There is also a large collection the Steubenville area's local newspaper, The Herald-Star, dating back to the early 19th century on microfilm. The genealogist on duty can assist in using these materials as well as the wide variety of online materials.

== Services and programs ==
The Schiappa Branch offers many free services, such as public notaries on duty during working hours, Internet access, Wi-Fi availability, and beginner computer instruction. The library also houses public copy machines and printers for a fee.

The library offers many programs for people of all ages. Children can visit the Tot Time, Babygarten, and Story Hour programs. Teen programs include bi-monthly videogame nights and an all-ages movie is shown once a month. Adult programs vary from month to month, but have – in the past – included wine tasting, cooking demonstrations, and author visits. For a complete list of upcoming programs, the library's website can be visited or customers can take a schedule from the circulation department.
