= WNKV (FM) =

Radio station in Burgettstown, Pennsylvania

- Burgettstown, Pennsylvania; United States
- Broadcast area: Western Pennsylvania; West Virginia Panhandle; Eastern Ohio
- Frequency: 103.5 MHz
- Branding: "103.5 K-Love"

Programming
- Format: Christian adult contemporary
- Network: K-Love

Ownership
- Owner: Educational Media Foundation
- Sister stations: WPKV

History
- First air date: May 1, 1947 (as WSTV-FM)
- Former call signs: WSTV-FM (1947–1974); WRKY (1974–2000); WOGE (2000); WOGH (2000–2017); WLYI (2017–2022); WOGH (2022–2025)
- Call sign meaning: K-Love

Technical information
- Licensing authority: FCC
- Facility ID: 65408
- Class: B
- ERP: 19,500 watts
- HAAT: 247 meters (810 ft)
- Transmitter coordinates: 40°20′33.2″N 80°37′13.3″W

Links
- Public license information: Public file; LMS

WNKV (103.5 FM, "103.5 K-Love”) is a non-commercial radio station licensed to Burgettstown, Pennsylvania. It serves Western Pennsylvania including part of Greater Pittsburgh, as well as the West Virginia Panhandle and Eastern Ohio. It is owned by Educational Media Foundation (EMF) and is an affiliate of K-Love, EMF's contemporary Christian music network.

WNKV has an effective radiated power (ERP) of 19,500 watts. The transmitter is on Burr Avenue in Mingo Junction, Ohio, near the Ohio River. It shares a tower with WTOV-TV.

== History ==
On May 1, 1947, the station signed on as WSTV-FM. It was originally licensed to Steubenville, Ohio, co-owned with WSTV (1340 AM). The two stations mostly simulcast, although WSTV went dark in 2011.

In the 2000s and early-mid 2010s, 103.5 was part of a multi-station simulcast known as "Froggy". Sister stations included the "Froggyland" flagship WOGI "Froggy 104.3", WOGG "Froggy 94.9" and WFGI-FM "Froggy 95.5". The station had Froggy-oriented call signs, WOGE in 2000 and WOGH from 2000 to 2017. The "Froggy" stations carried a country music format.

=== Willie 103.5 ===
WLYI on a SPARC HD Radio with RDS.

On April 11, 2017, WOGH split from the "Froggy" simulcast and flipped to classic country, branded as "Willie 103.5." On April 17, 2017, WOGH changed its call letters to WLYI, to go with the "Willie 103.5" branding.

WLYI had an application with the Federal Communications Commission (FCC) to move its tower location from Jefferson County, Ohio, to an area near Imperial, Pennsylvania, thus giving it complete coverage within the Pittsburgh metropolitan area. However that application was dismissed by the FCC for failing to provide FAA registration data for the application.

=== Froggy returns ===
On August 1, 2022, WLYI flipped back to country, once again as part of "Froggy". The station changed its call letters back to WOGH with the change.

=== Sale to EMF ===
On November 8, 2024, Forever Media announced that it was selling WOGH to Educational Media Foundation, which announced plans to bring the K-Love Christian contemporary music format to the signal, giving the network full coverage in the Pittsburgh market (supplementing WPKV) and the upper Ohio Valley. The station officially flipped from country to the K-Love format in March 2025. On March 19, 2025, the call sign was changed to WNKV, which was moved from WRNV in Norco, Louisiana.
