= Domenick Mucci Jr. =

Mayor of Steubenville, Ohio
- In office November 8, 1993 – January 1, 2018
- Succeeded by: Jerry Barilla

Personal details
- Born: 1956 (age 69–70)
- Party: Democratic
- Education: Steubenville Catholic Central High School

Domenick Mucci Jr. (born 1956) served as Mayor of Steubenville, Ohio, winning six four-year terms of office from 1993 to 2017. He is also the executive director for the Jefferson County Chamber of Commerce.

A Steubenville native, Mucci's parents were both born and raised in Steubenville, and his father was a second generation immigrant from Italy. In the 2013 election, Mucci won 50.41% of the vote against challenger Lou Arrico, a Republican, who had previously run against Mucci in 2009 and lost by a thousand votes. Turnout in 2013 was 30.74%. Mucci was the acting city manager of Steubenville in 2013. Though the mayor is responsible for appointing people to several boards and commissions, mayor is largely a ceremonial position, with such roles as presiding over Council meetings and representing the city at regional and state meetings. In 2012 for example, Mayor Mucci attended 302 meetings in the community, presided over 48 council meetings, and performed 34 weddings. In rare instances, the Mayor breaks a tie in city council voting.

Mucci has had three alcohol-related driving offenses. On July 31, 2011, Mucci hit two parked vehicles in Steubenville at 2:22am. After originally entering a not guilty plea on August 1, 2013, Mucci pleaded guilty to drunk driving on August 23, and was sentenced to three days in jail, one year of probation, a $524 fine, and six months of limited driving privileges. Mucci spent October 14–16 in the Harrison County, Ohio, jail.

Mucci announced in January 2017 that he would not seek re-election. He was succeeded by Jerry Barilla.
