= Charles "Red" Donley =

American sports broadcaster

- Born: January 6, 1923; Wellsburg, West Virginia, U.S.
- Died: February 2, 1998 (aged 75); Steubenville, Ohio, U.S.
- Other name: Red Donley
- Occupation: News anchor
- Years active: 1947–1988

Charles "Red" Donley (January 6, 1923 – February 2, 1998) was an American sports and news anchor in the Ohio Valley.

A 1941 graduate of Wellsburgh High School, Donley served as a corporal in the United States Marine Corps from February 1942 to September 1945 before joining the WSTV radio team as a sports commentator in 1947. In 1953, Donley became the new TV station's first sports director, and shortly after joined the Pittsburgh Steelers broadcast team, where he served as an announcer from 1955 to 1961. In 1961, after 14 years with WSTV, Donley left for Pittsburgh to become the sports director at WIIC-TV/WPXI, where he won five Golden Quill awards for journalism in western Pennsylvania. At this time, Donley also left the Steelers team to become the "Voice of the Pitt Panthers". In October 1970, Donley returned to Steubenville and WSTV-TV to take on the role of news director, where he remained until his retirement on October 28, 1988. Donley died on February 2, 1998, and is survived by his wife Mary, son Shawn, and granddaughter Jennifer.

Donley received many honors over the years, including an honorary degree from the Franciscan University of Steubenville in 1989, and was inducted into the Ohio AP broadcaster hall of fame in 2006.
