= Fort Steuben =

Historic fort in the United States

Coordinates: 40°21′28″N 80°36′48″W

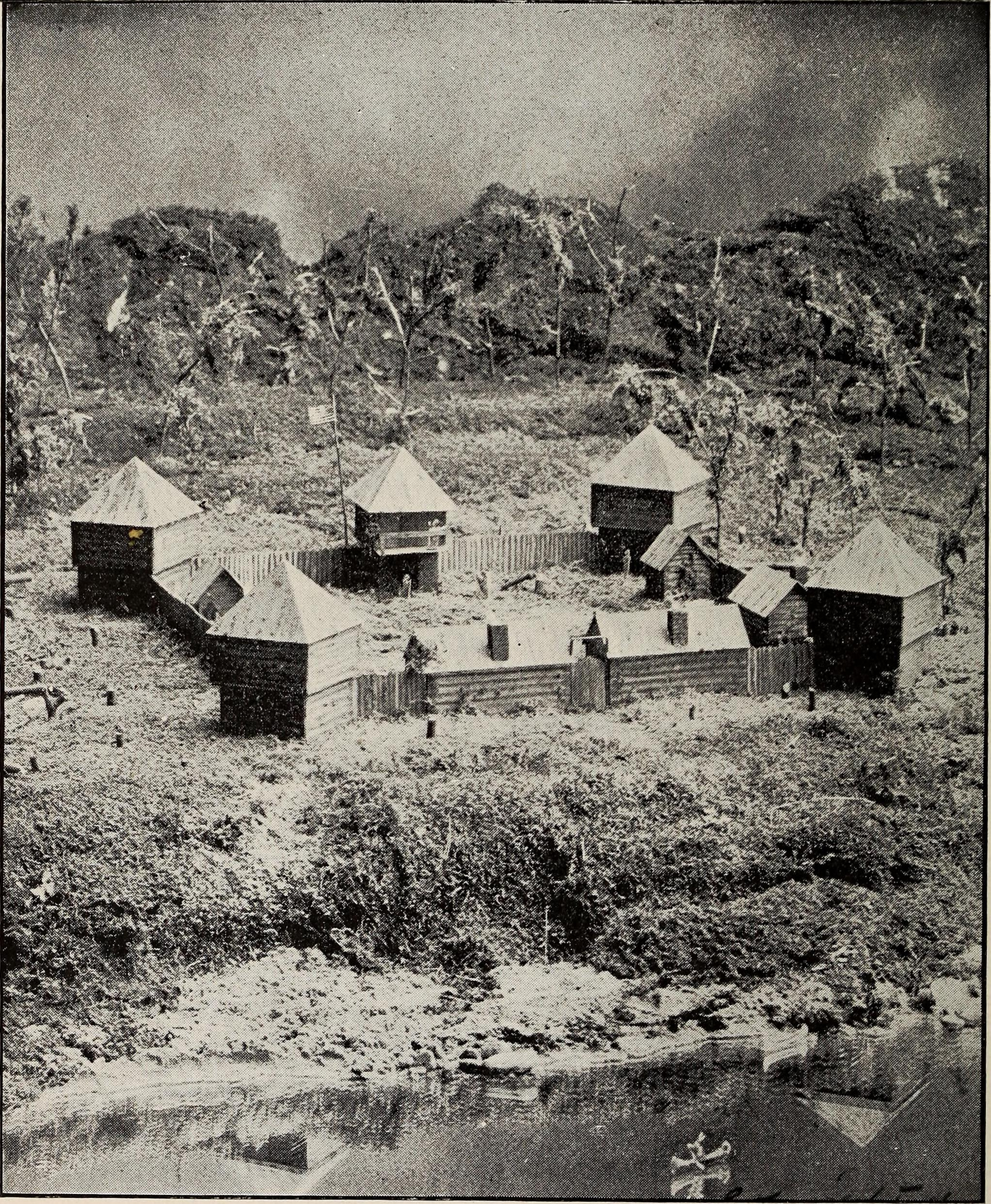
Dioramic reconstruction of Fort Steuben by C.P. Filson

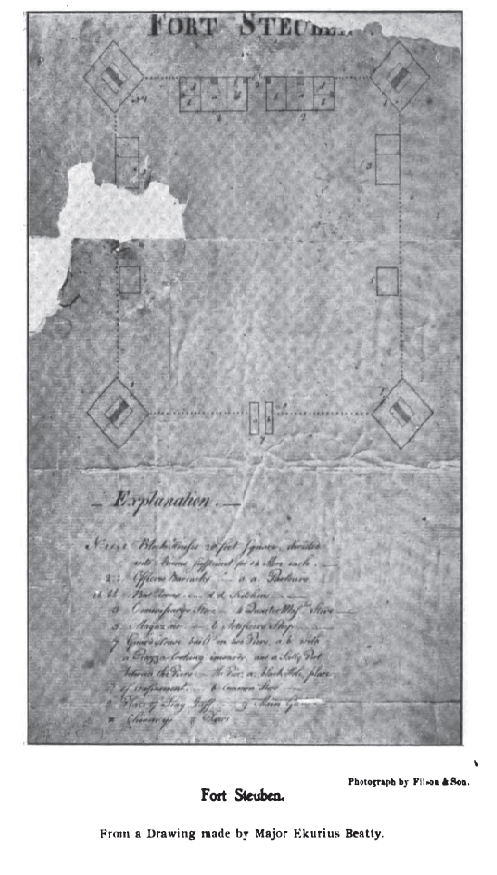
1787 drawing of Fort Steuben by Major Erkuries Beatty

Fort Steuben was a fortification erected in Feb. 1787 on the Ohio River in eastern Ohio Country at the northern end of the Seven Ranges land tract to be surveyed. It was at the location of the modern city of Steubenville, Ohio. The fort was built by Major John Hamtramck and named for Friedrich Wilhelm von Steuben, a Prussian army officer who had served under General Washington. The original purpose was to provide protection from Indians for the first surveyors to venture into the Northwest Territory.

== History ==
Acquired by Great Britain from France following the 1763 Treaty of Paris, the Ohio Country had been closed to white settlement by the Proclamation of 1763. The United States claimed the region after the 1783 Treaty of Paris that ended the American Revolutionary War. The Congress passed the Land Ordinance of 1785 as a formal means of surveying, selling, and settling the land and raising revenue. The survey was to begin in present-day East Liverpool, Ohio, on the north bank of the Ohio River where it leaves Pennsylvania, and then work westward into present day Ohio. The Geographer of the United States, Thomas Hutchins, assisted by surveyors from a number of states, began the survey on September 30, 1785. On October 8, word was received of an Indian attack on the Tuscarawas River. He and his men were scared, and returned to Pittsburgh after only a few miles of the first westward line, (the Geographers Line), had been completed. Hutchins returned to New York that autumn.

On July 20, 1786, Hutchins and his group gathered at Pittsburgh, Pennsylvania to resume their survey. Fort Harmar had been constructed at the confluence of the Muskingum River and Ohio River, present day Harmar district of Marietta, Ohio. Hutchins had requested federal troops for protection. Colonel Josiah Harmar ordered Major John Francis Hamtramck and some of the First American Regiment to guard the surveyors. Hamtramck felt it necessary to build a fort to protect the surveyors, and to prevent squatters from settling in the area.

== Fort constructed ==
The site was chosen for a fort on October 11, 1786. Major Erkuries Beatty, who made a drawing seen here, described the site as 47 miles below Fort McIntosh and 23 above Wheelin‘, a site he erroneously calls Mingo Bottom. Major Beatty described the fort:

It is about 120 yards from the river on very high excellent bank of commanding ground. A square with a large blockhouse on each corner and picquets between each blockhouse form the fort. . .The big gate fronting the main on the west, and the sally port the river, with the guard house over the latter. The blockhouse serves for all the men and the officers‘ houses are each side of the big gate, the back part of them serving as a row of pickets. It is garrisoned by Capt. Hamtramck‘s and Mercer‘s companies, the former commanding.

— Major Erkuries Beatty, 1787

Hamtramck named the fort for military officer Baron von Steuben on January 2, 1787, and completed construction January 8. On May 23, 1787, Hamtramck was ordered to evacuate, as the surveyors were by then closer to Fort Harmar. Troops were sent to Fort Harmar, while supplies were sent to Fort Henry in Wheeling. The fort was destroyed by fire in 1790, and not rebuilt. In 1797, Bezaleel Wells founded the city of Steubenville on the site. A replica of the fort and visitors center have been constructed on the site as a tourist attraction that also includes the original Steubenville Federal Land Office.

== See also ==
- Seven Ranges
