= Steubenville, Ohio =

- City
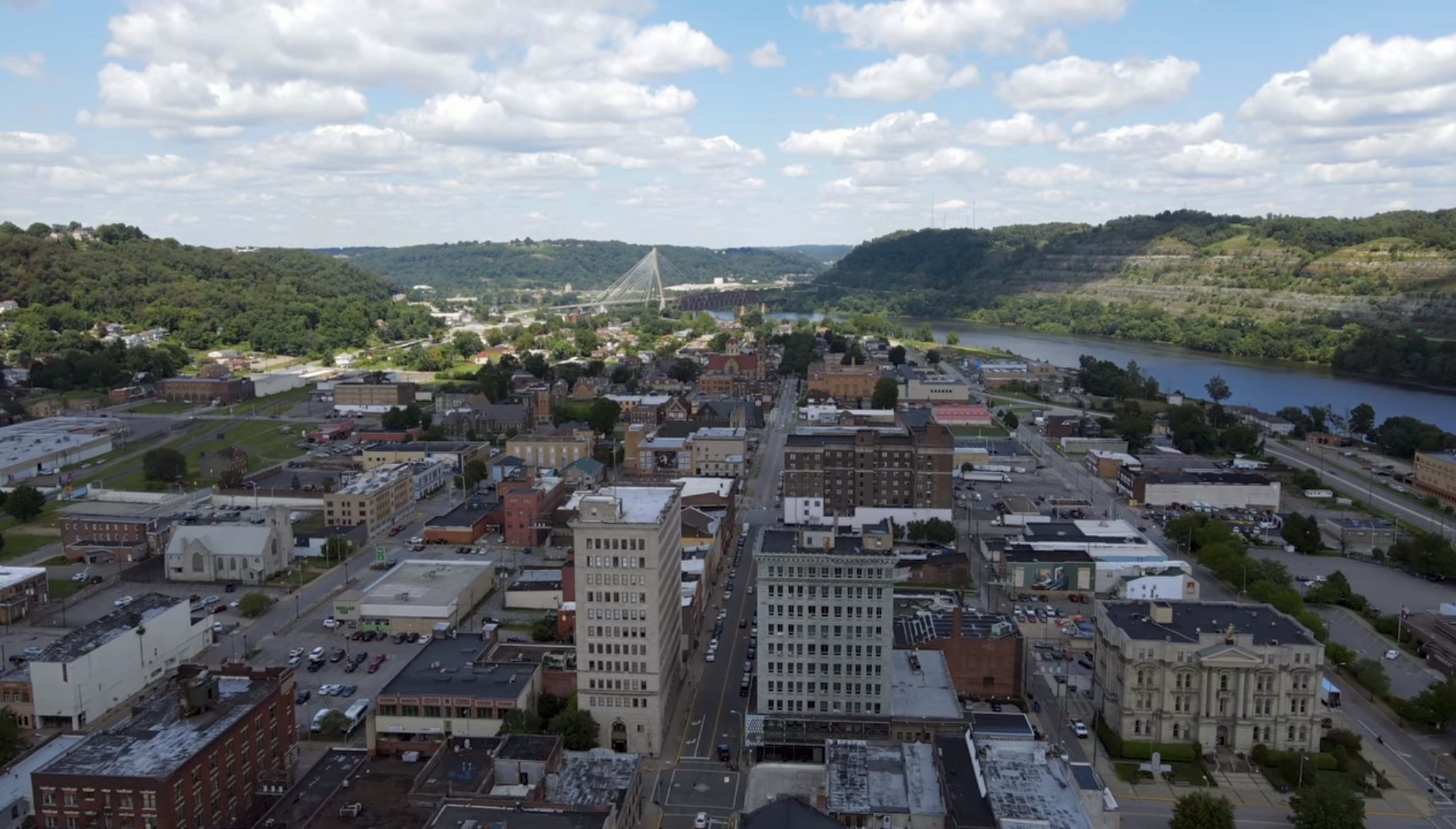
- Steubenville from the air, looking north

- Seal
- Nickname: "City of Murals"
- Motto: Where you always have a home
- Interactive map of Steubenville, Ohio
- Location within Ohio Location within the United States
- Coordinates: 40°21′55″N 80°38′00″W
- Country: United States
- State: Ohio
- County: Jefferson
- Founded: 1795
- Named for: Friedrich Wilhelm von Steuben

Government
  - Type: Council–manager
  - Mayor: Ralph Petrella (R)

Area
  - City: 10.62 sq mi (27.50 km^{2})
  - Land: 10.54 sq mi (27.29 km^{2})
  - Water: 0.081 sq mi (0.21 km^{2})
- Elevation: 1,132 ft (345 m)

Population (2020)
  - City: 18,161
  - Density: 1,723.5/sq mi (665.46/km^{2})
  - Metro: 118,250 (US: 340th)
  - CSA: 2,659,937 (US: 23rd)
- Time zone: UTC-5 (EST)
  - Summer (DST): UTC-4 (EDT)
- ZIP Codes: 43952, 43953
- Area codes: 740, 220
- FIPS code: 39-74608
- GNIS feature ID: 1086386
- Website: cityofsteubenville.us

Steubenville (/ˈstjuːbənvɪl/ STEW-bən-vil) is a city in Jefferson County, Ohio, United States, and its county seat. The city is located on the eastern border of Ohio along the Ohio River, abutting the northern panhandle of West Virginia and 33 miles (53 km) west of Pittsburgh, Pennsylvania. Steubenville had a population of 18,161 at the 2020 census. The Weirton–Steubenville metropolitan area has an estimated 113,000 residents. The city's name is derived from Fort Steuben, a 1786 fort that sat within the city's current limits and was named for Prussian military officer Baron Friedrich Wilhelm von Steuben.

Steubenville's nickname is the "City of Murals" after its more than 25 downtown murals. Historically, it was known as the hometown of Edwin Stanton, secretary of war during the American Civil War, as well as popular Rat Pack entertainer Dean Martin. It gains attention annually for the Steubenville Nutcracker Village, an annual Christmastime event. It is home to the campus of Franciscan University of Steubenville.

== History ==
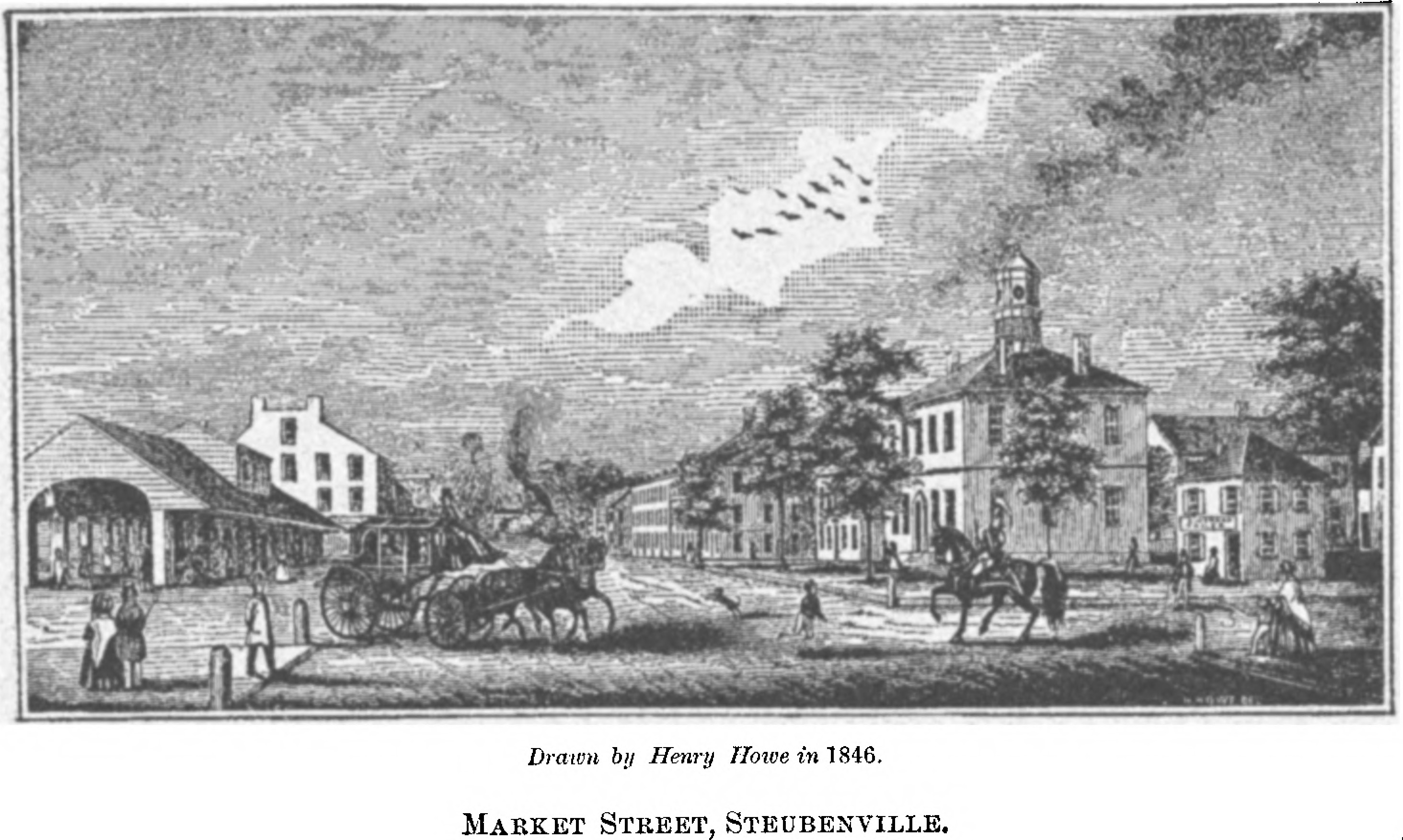
An 1846 engraving of downtown Steubenville, with the Jefferson County Courthouse visible on the right

In 1786–87, soldiers of the First American Regiment under Major Jean François Hamtramck built Fort Steuben to protect the government surveyors mapping the land west of the Ohio River. The fort was named in honor of Baron Friedrich Wilhelm von Steuben, a Prussian army officer who reformed the Continental Army during the American Revolution. When the surveyors completed their task a few years later, the fort was abandoned. In the meantime, settlers had built homes around the fort; they named their settlement Steubenville. The town was sometimes referred to as La Belle City, a franglais interpretation of "The Beautiful City".

On July 29, 1797, Jefferson County was organized by a proclamation of Governor Arthur St. Clair, and Steubenville was selected as the county seat. It was platted in the same year by Bezaliel Wells and James Ross, the city's co-founders. Wells, a government surveyor born in Baltimore, received about 1,000 acres (4 km^{2}) of land west of the Ohio River; Ross, a lawyer from Pittsburgh, owned the land north of Wells.

On March 1, 1803, Ohio was admitted to the Union as the 17th state. During the first half of the nineteenth century, Steubenville was primarily a port town, and the rest of the county was small villages and farms. Steubenville received a city charter in 1851. In 1856, Frazier, Kilgore and Company erected a rolling mill (the forerunner of steel mills) and the Steubenville Coal and Mining Company sank a coal shaft. The city was a stop along the Pittsburgh, Cincinnati, Chicago and St. Louis Railroad, which connected Pittsburgh to Chicago and St. Louis.

The Steubenville Female Seminary, also known as Beatty's Seminary for Young Ladies or Steubenville Seminary, was an early private educational institution for women founded by Presbyterian minister Charles Clinton Beatty in 1829. It was closed in 1898 and the buildings were eventually razed for part of what is now Ohio State Route 7.

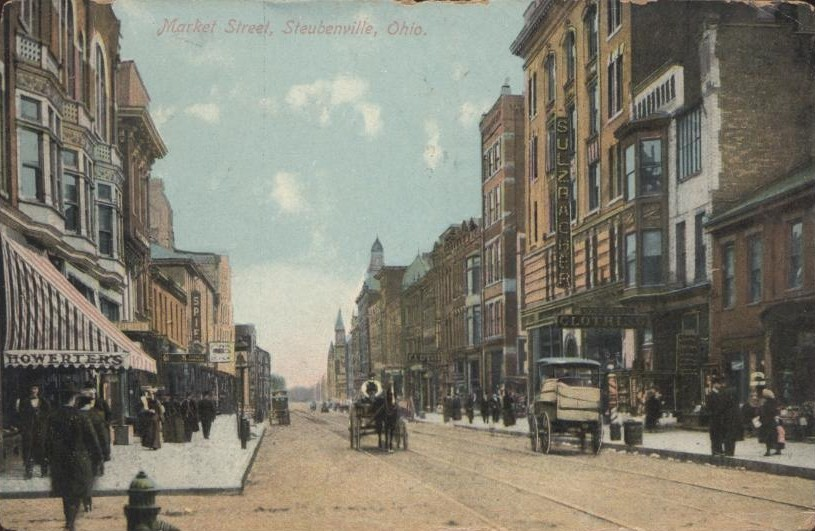
Market Street in 1910

In 1946, the College of Steubenville was founded by the Friars of the Third Order of St. Francis. In 1980, its name was changed to University of Steubenville, and finally in 1985 to Franciscan University of Steubenville. In 1966, the Jefferson County Technical Institute was founded. In 1977, its name was changed to Jefferson Technical College. In 1995, it became a community college and was renamed Jefferson Community College. In 2009, the college expanded its service district by three Ohio counties, and was renamed again: Eastern Gateway Community College.

In 1997, the United States Department of Justice accused the city and its police force of subjecting individuals to excessive force, false arrests, and improper stops, searches, and seizures, as well as retaliating against those who witnessed police misconduct or criticized the force. The department's report also noted that officers falsified reports and tampered with police recorders to hide misconduct. This led the city to become the second in the U.S. to sign a consent decree with the federal government, agreeing to improve police training, establish new guidelines, and create an internal affairs unit. The decree ended on March 4, 2005, after reforms were implemented, and in 2020, the city council reviewed and confirmed ongoing improvements in use of force policies, training, and data.

The city's speed camera program, which began in 2005, generated $600,000 in revenue from nearly 7,000 tickets issued. However, in March 2006, the Jefferson County Court of Common Pleas ruled the program's supporting ordinance unconstitutional. Despite this, the city refused to remove the cameras, citing a contract with Traffipax, Inc. and defied the judge's order by reinstating an identical ordinance. Councilman Michael Hernon was the only one to dissent. In mid-2006, an attorney filed a class-action lawsuit, and in December 2007, the city was forced to refund $258,000 for illegally collected fines. Additionally, a referendum in November 2006 led to a 76.2% majority vote to end the program.

The city gained international attention in late 2012 from the events surrounding the Steubenville High School rape case, which occurred in August 2012. The case was first covered by The New York Times that December, followed by the computer hacker group Anonymous later that month, and the subsequent coverage of the trials in late 2013. The case was significant in the extensive use of social media as evidence and in opening a national discussion on the concept of rape culture.

== Geography ==
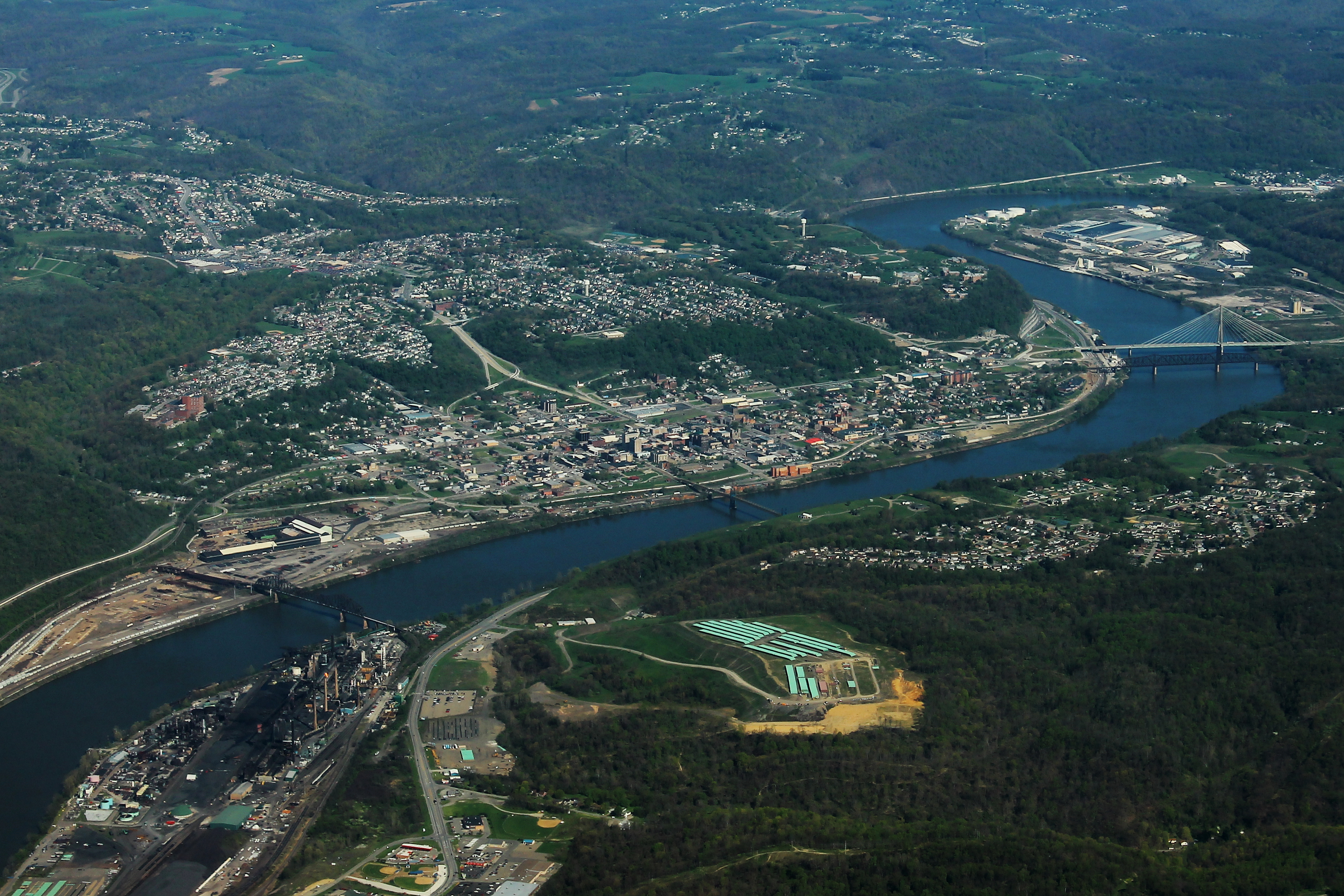
Aerial view of Steubenville. The Veterans Memorial Bridge (top right) connects Steubenville to Weirton, West Virginia, across the Ohio River via U.S. Route 22.

According to the United States Census Bureau, the city has a total area of 10.63 square miles (27.53 km^{2}), of which 10.55 square miles (27.32 km^{2}) is land and 0.08 square miles (0.21 km^{2}) is water. The city lies along the Ohio River, with the city spreading west from the floodplains to the hills that surround the city. It lies within the ecoregion of the Western Allegheny Plateau.

=== Climate ===
The climate in this area is characterized by hot summers and relatively cold winters and evenly distributed precipitation throughout the year. As detailed in a March 2022 guide from the Climate Receiver Places Project at the PLACE initiative, Steubenville is a climate resilient geography based on its relatively low climate change risk exposure. According to the Köppen Climate Classification system, Steubenville has a humid continental climate, abbreviated "Dfa" on climate maps.

Climate data for Steubenville, Ohio (1991–2020 normals, extremes 1941–present)
Month	Jan	Feb	Mar	Apr	May	Jun	Jul	Aug	Sep	Oct	Nov	Dec	Year
Record high °F (°C)	75 (24)	79 (26)	84 (29)	89 (32)	93 (34)	98 (37)	102 (39)	100 (38)	101 (38)	91 (33)	85 (29)	77 (25)	102 (39)
Mean maximum °F (°C)	61.7 (16.5)	64.2 (17.9)	73.5 (23.1)	81.3 (27.4)	86.2 (30.1)	90.6 (32.6)	91.5 (33.1)	90.6 (32.6)	87.9 (31.1)	80.0 (26.7)	71.0 (21.7)	61.9 (16.6)	92.8 (33.8)
Mean daily maximum °F (°C)	36.5 (2.5)	40.0 (4.4)	48.9 (9.4)	62.2 (16.8)	71.7 (22.1)	79.4 (26.3)	82.9 (28.3)	81.9 (27.7)	75.5 (24.2)	63.5 (17.5)	51.0 (10.6)	41.0 (5.0)	61.2 (16.2)
Daily mean °F (°C)	27.9 (−2.3)	30.3 (−0.9)	38.0 (3.3)	50.0 (10.0)	60.3 (15.7)	68.6 (20.3)	72.7 (22.6)	71.3 (21.8)	64.8 (18.2)	52.7 (11.5)	41.5 (5.3)	33.0 (0.6)	50.9 (10.5)
Mean daily minimum °F (°C)	19.2 (−7.1)	20.6 (−6.3)	27.1 (−2.7)	37.8 (3.2)	48.9 (9.4)	57.9 (14.4)	62.5 (16.9)	60.8 (16.0)	54.1 (12.3)	42.0 (5.6)	31.9 (−0.1)	25.0 (−3.9)	40.6 (4.8)
Mean minimum °F (°C)	2.0 (−16.7)	6.4 (−14.2)	12.5 (−10.8)	25.1 (−3.8)	35.7 (2.1)	45.5 (7.5)	52.6 (11.4)	51.3 (10.7)	42.7 (5.9)	30.8 (−0.7)	19.9 (−6.7)	10.4 (−12.0)	−0.3 (−17.9)
Record low °F (°C)	−22 (−30)	−13 (−25)	−8 (−22)	15 (−9)	24 (−4)	32 (0)	43 (6)	40 (4)	33 (1)	19 (−7)	−1 (−18)	−14 (−26)	−22 (−30)
Average precipitation inches (mm)	3.46 (88)	2.51 (64)	3.24 (82)	3.65 (93)	4.29 (109)	4.90 (124)	4.02 (102)	3.54 (90)	3.81 (97)	3.42 (87)	3.17 (81)	3.15 (80)	43.16 (1,096)
Average precipitation days (≥ 0.01 in)	16.7	12.3	13.3	14.4	13.9	12.3	11.4	9.8	9.6	11.1	12.3	14.4	151.5
Source: NOAA

== Demographics ==
Historical population
Census	Pop.	Note	%±
1800	731		—
1810	1,617		121.2%
1820	2,479		53.3%
1830	2,937		18.5%
1840	4,247		44.6%
1850	6,140		44.6%
1860	6,154		0.2%
1870	8,107		31.7%
1880	12,093		49.2%
1890	13,394		10.8%
1900	14,349		7.1%
1910	22,391		56.0%
1920	28,508		27.3%
1930	35,422		24.3%
1940	37,651		6.3%
1950	35,872		−4.7%
1960	32,495		−9.4%
1970	30,771		−5.3%
1980	26,400		−14.2%
1990	22,125		−16.2%
2000	19,015		−14.1%
2010	18,659		−1.9%
2020	18,161		−2.7%

The city's population peaked in 1940 at 37,651. After large declines for many decades, the population decline stabilized some, with the 2010 and 2020 censuses showing the smallest declines in any decade since the peak.

Steubenville is a principal city of the Weirton–Steubenville metropolitan area and is part of the larger Pittsburgh–New Castle–Weirton combined statistical area. From 1980 to 2000, census figures show that the Weirton–Steubenville metro population decreased faster than that of any other urban area in the United States.

=== 2020 census ===
As of the 2020 census, Steubenville had a population of 18,161. The median age was 37.9 years. 19.9% of residents were under the age of 18 and 19.4% of residents were 65 years of age or older. For every 100 females there were 88.9 males, and for every 100 females age 18 and over there were 86.8 males age 18 and over.

99.9% of residents lived in urban areas, while 0.1% lived in rural areas.

There were 7,105 households in Steubenville, of which 25.2% had children under the age of 18 living in them. Of all households, 33.0% were married-couple households, 23.2% were households with a male householder and no spouse or partner present, and 35.6% were households with a female householder and no spouse or partner present. About 38.2% of all households were made up of individuals and 16.2% had someone living alone who was 65 years of age or older.

There were 8,431 housing units, of which 15.7% were vacant. The homeowner vacancy rate was 2.4% and the rental vacancy rate was 11.7%.

Racial composition as of the 2020 census
Race	Number	Percent
White	13,640	75.1%
Black or African American	2,759	15.2%
American Indian and Alaska Native	48	0.3%
Asian	186	1.0%
Native Hawaiian and Other Pacific Islander	8	0.0%
Some other race	231	1.3%
Two or more races	1,289	7.1%
Hispanic or Latino (of any race)	610	3.4%

=== 2010 census ===
As of the census of 2010, there were 18,659 people, 7,548 households, and 4,220 families residing in the city. The population density was 1,768.6 inhabitants per square mile (682.9/km^{2}). There were 8,857 housing units at an average density of 839.5 per square mile (324.1/km^{2}). The racial makeup of the city was 79.0% White, 15.9% African American, 0.2% Native American, 0.8% Asian, 0.6% from other races, and 3.5% from two or more races. Hispanic or Latino of any race were 2.4% of the population.

There were 7,548 households, of which 25.3% had children under the age of 18 living with them, 34.8% were married couples living together, 16.2% had a female householder with no husband present, 4.8% had a male householder with no wife present, and 44.1% were non-families. 37.1% of all households were made up of individuals, and 15.7% had someone living alone who was 65 years of age or older. The average household size was 2.22 and the average family size was 2.91.

The median age in the city was 38.8 years. 20.3% of residents were under the age of 18; 16.1% were between the ages of 18 and 24; 20.3% were from 25 to 44; 25.9% were from 45 to 64; and 17.5% were 65 years of age or older. The gender makeup of the city was 46.1% male and 53.9% female.

=== 2000 census ===
As of the census of 2000, there were 19,015 people, 8,342 households, and 4,880 families residing in the city. The population density was 1,842.2 inhabitants per square mile (711.3/km^{2}). There were 9,449 housing units at an average density of 915.4 per square mile (353.4/km^{2}). The racial makeup of the city was 79.55% White, 17.25% African American, 0.22% Native American, 0.73% Asian, 0.01% Pacific Islander, 0.53% from other races, and 1.70% from two or more races. Hispanic or Latino of any race were 0.97% of the population.

There were 8,342 households, out of which 23.4% had children under the age of 18 living with them, 40.2% were married couples living together, 14.9% had a female householder, and 41.5% were non-families. 36.4% of all households were made up of individuals, and 18.0% had someone living alone who was 65 years of age or older. The average household size was 2.19 and the average family size was 2.86.

In the city, the population was spread out, with 21.2% under the age of 18, 8.1% from 18 to 24, 24.3% from 25 to 44, 24.2% from 45 to 64, and 22.2% who were 65 years of age or older. The median age was 43 years. For every 100 females, there were 85.6 males. For every 100 females age 18 and over, there were 80.8 males.

The median income for a household in the city was $26,516, and the median income for a family was $36,597. Males had a median income of $36,416 versus $21,819 for females. The per capita income for the city was $17,830. About 15.3% of families and 20.4% of the population were below the poverty line, including 29.2% of those under the age of 18 and 11.0% of those aged 65 and older.

=== Religion ===
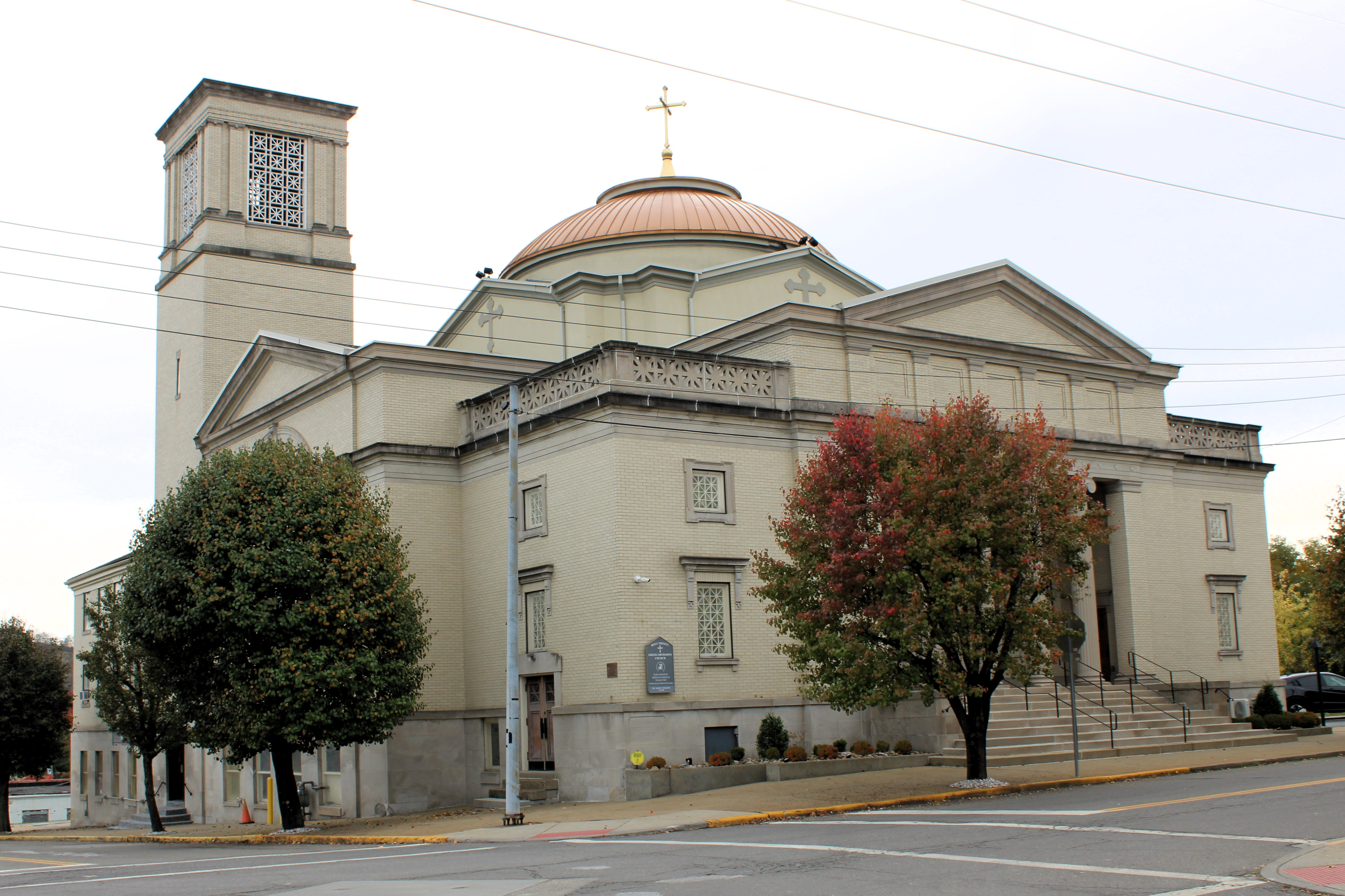
Holy Trinity Greek Orthodox Church

Steubenville is the seat of the Roman Catholic Diocese of Steubenville. Holy Name Church was selected as the diocesan cathedral in 1944 when the southeastern part of the Roman Catholic Diocese of Columbus was made into the Diocese of Steubenville. In October 2022, the diocese announced that the Vatican was considering merging it with the Diocese of Columbus. The proposal was placed on hold the following month.

Holy Trinity Greek Orthodox Church is a historic Greek Orthodox church building near downtown Steubenville. Built in 1914, it was formerly home to a Methodist congregation and is listed on the National Register of Historic Places.

Steubenville contained approximately 300 Jewish families in the 1950s; the city's last synagogue closed in 2013.

== Economy ==
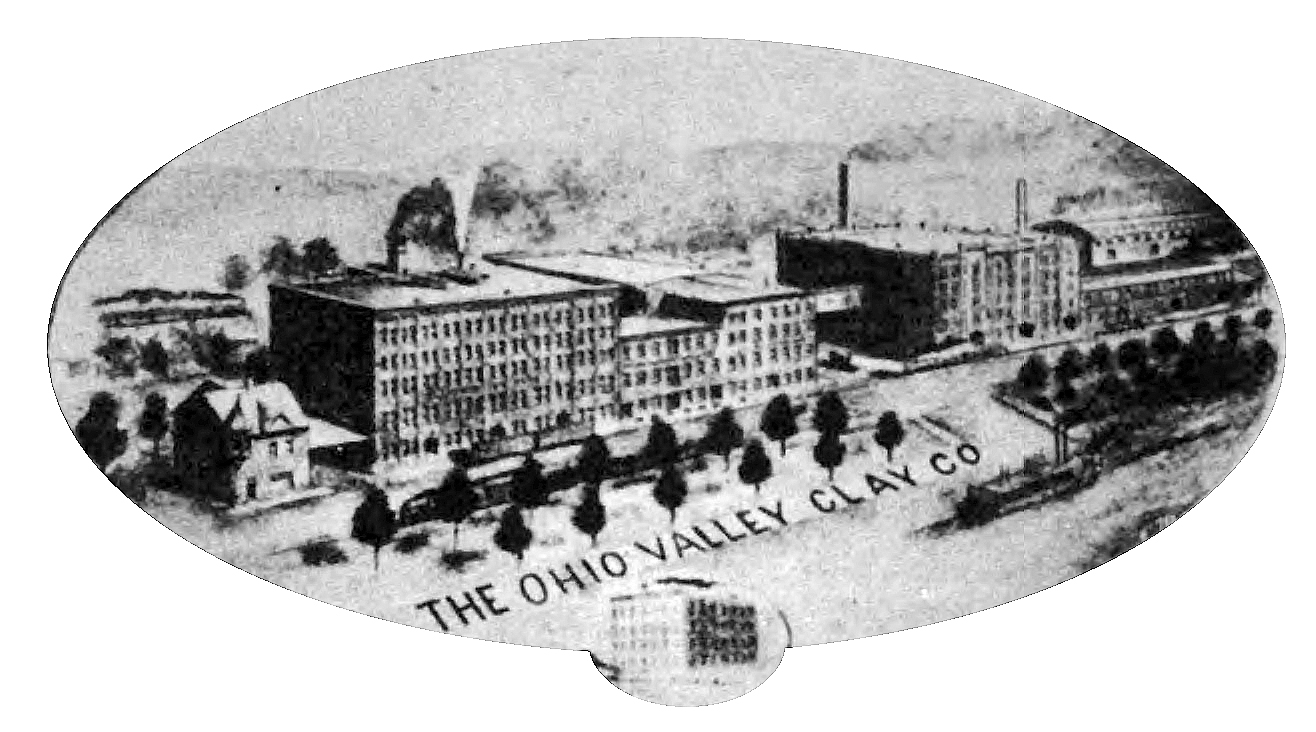
A 1910 engraving of the Ohio Valley Clay Company

Steubenville and the communities that surround it, especially Weirton, West Virginia, have experienced sluggish economies since the steel industry waned during the 1980s. Corporations such as Weirton Steel have had to reduce their workforce in order to become more efficient and competitive against other steel producers and lower steel prices worldwide.

Starting in 2014, the Harmonium Project and numerous others partners began a series of street festivals called First Fridays on Fourth to build community and generate interest and economic activity downtown. More recently there have been several new businesses opened Downtown on 4th Street, including Drosselmeyer's Nutcracker Shoppe, Leonardo's Coffeehouse and the Steubenville Popcorn Co.

The new Findlay Connector has been built in western Pennsylvania as a toll-access highway between Pittsburgh International Airport at Interstate 376 and U.S. Route 22 in northwestern Washington County. Travel time between the Pittsburgh International Airport and the city of Steubenville is now approximately 25 minutes.

Steubenville is located near two large shale formations: the Marcellus and Utica formations.

== Arts and culture ==
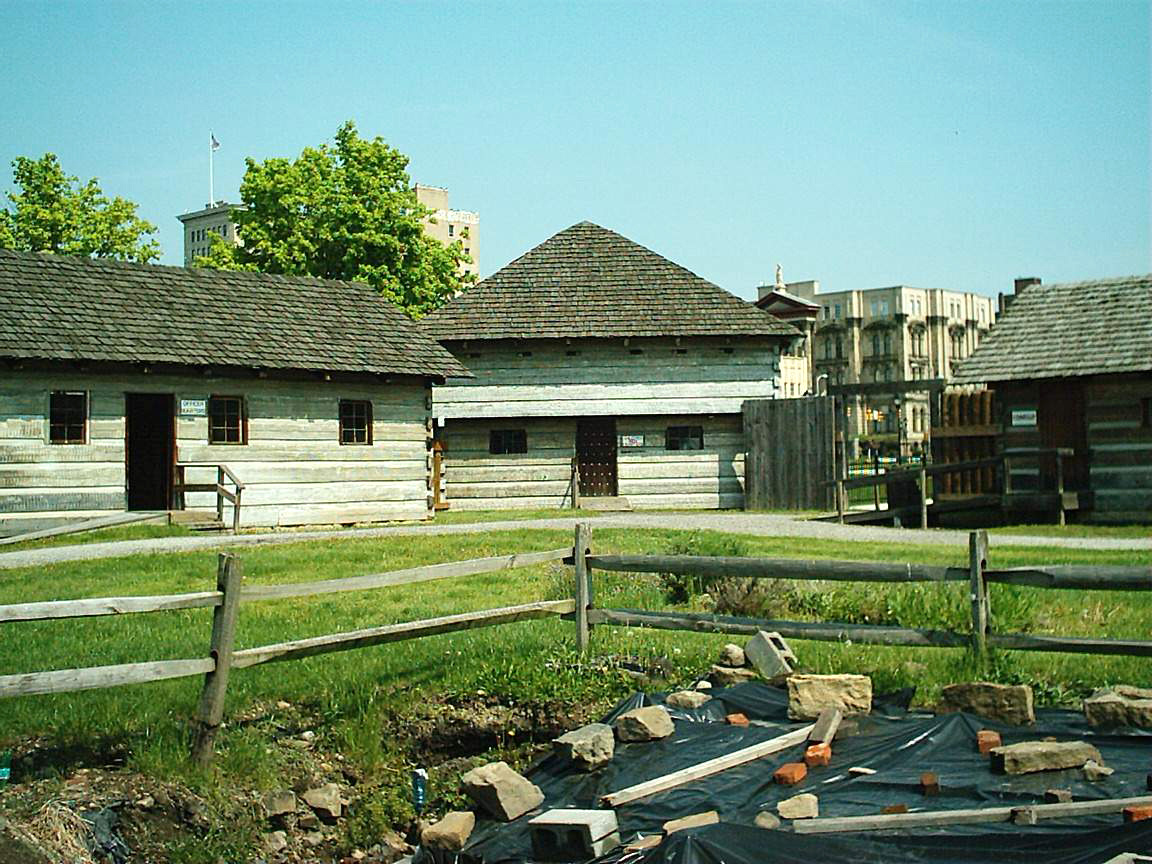
An archaeological dig on the grounds of the reconstructed Fort Steuben

Steubenville is the birthplace of Ohio Valley-style pizza, a distinctive style of pizza that features cold toppings on a baked crust.

Actor, singer and comedian Dean Martin was born and raised in Steubenville, and the town features an annual Dean Martin Festival and a Dean Martin Room at the Jefferson County Historical Museum and Library.

Between 1887 and 1913, a team known as the Steubenville Stubs sparsely played minor league baseball at various times in the Ohio State League, Interstate League, Ohio–Pennsylvania League and Pennsylvania–Ohio–Maryland League. The Steubenville Stampede was a member of the Continental Indoor Football League from 2006 to 2007.

=== Historic sites ===
Fort Steuben, located downtown on South Third Street, is a reconstructed 18th-century fort on its original location overlooking the Ohio River. Built in 1787 to protect the government surveyors of the Seven Ranges of the Northwest Territory, Fort Steuben housed 150 men of the 1st American Regiment. The non-profit organization that worked to rebuild the fort also developed the surrounding block into Fort Steuben Park which includes the Veterans Memorial Fountain and the Berkman Amphitheater. The Fort Steuben Visitors Center is home to the Museum Shop and the Steubenville Convention & Visitors Bureau and is an official site on the Ohio River Scenic Byway.

Adjacent to the fort is the First Federal Land Office with its original logs from 1801. After the Ohio country was surveyed, it could be sold or given away as land grants; the settlers brought their deeds to be registered at the Land Office to David Hoge, the Registrar of Lands and Titles for the Northwest Territory.

=== Public art ===
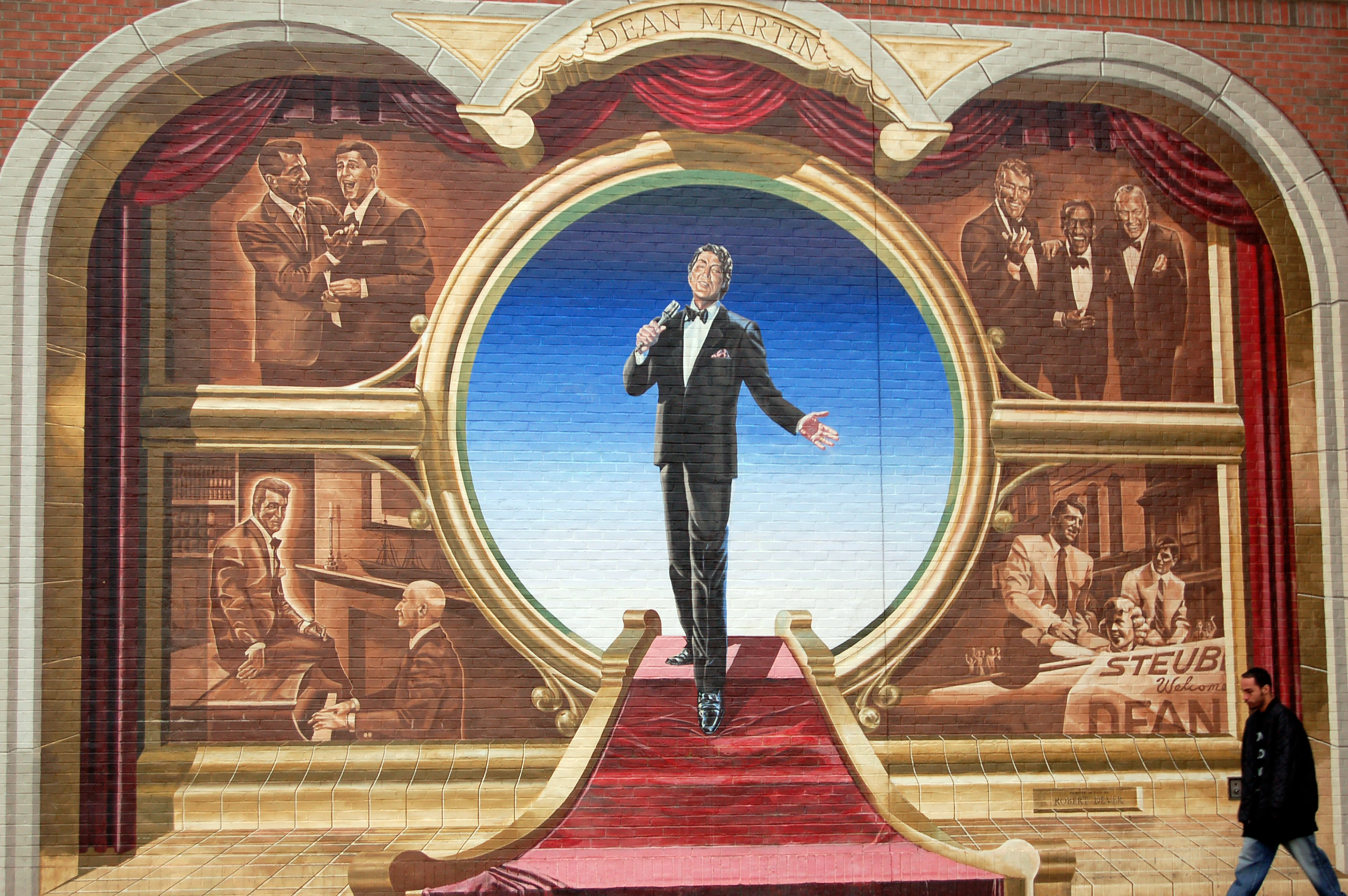
A mural of entertainer Dean Martin, who was born and raised in Steubenville

Steubenville's nickname is the "City of Murals", because there are more than 25 downtown murals. There are numerous murals, markers and a walking tour in Steubenville, many paying homage to Dean Martin. There is also a mural Washington Street dedicated to two Tuskegee Airmen who were brothers, John Ellis Edwards and Jerome Edwards.

The "Ohio Valley Steelworker" Statue was created by artist Dimitri Akis as a tribute to Ohio Valley steelworkers. The life-size figure carries a long-handled dipping ladle and is wearing the hooded fire-proof suit worn in the steel mills. The statue was located at the junction of Hwy 22 (University Blvd) and Hwy 7 (Dean Martin Blvd). In the fall of 2014, the statue was moved to its new home, displayed on South Fourth Street at the site of the Public Library of Steubenville and Jefferson County. There is a statue downtown commemorating Edwin Stanton, President Abraham Lincoln's secretary of war. Stanton was born and raised in Steubenville.

=== Nutcracker village ===
In 2015, two local businessmen started a Christmas-themed festival, the Steubenville Nutcracker Village and Advent Market. The event is centered around a large collection life-size nutcracker sculptures spread throughout Fort Steuben Park in downtown Steubenville. The Nutcracker Village is free and open to the public 24 hours a day and generally runs from the Tuesday before Thanksgiving to Epiphany Sunday in early January.

The event began in 2015 with 37 locally produced, hand-painted nutcrackers. They are made of fiberglass and foam at a local business. Design and production takes about 40 hours each. In the second year, there were a total of 75 nutcrackers; by 2023, there were 209 around town. Each of the nutcrackers, which range in height from 5 to 9 feet (1.5 to 2.7 m) tall is unique, and the designs include fictional characters from books, movies, comic strips, and songs, holiday characters like Mrs. Claus, and professions, such as a steel welder.

Live entertainment and a German-style Advent Market featuring local artisans and craftsmen, as well as hot food and drink vendors, runs each weekend through the month of December in Fort Steuben Park to coincide with the Nutcracker Village event. The popularity of the Nutcracker Village since its inception has inspired other nutcracker-themed ventures in the City of Steubenville, including Drosselmeyer's Nutcracker Shoppe, a year-round Christmas shop in downtown Steubenville, and Wooden Hearts Follies, a locally-written and performed musical centered around characters from the event. The Nutcracker Village attracted over 40,000 visitors in 2017 and is credited with bringing new life to Steubenville's downtown area.

== Government ==
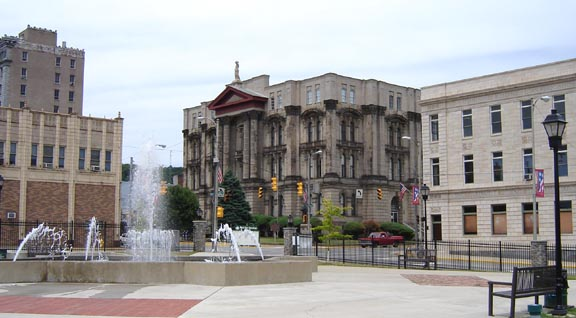
The Jefferson County Courthouse in downtown Steubenville

Ralph Petrella assumed office as the mayor of Steubenville on December 16, 2025. The city is part of Ohio's 96th House of Representatives district and Ohio's 30th senatorial district at the state level, as well as Ohio's 6th congressional district at the federal level.

== Education ==
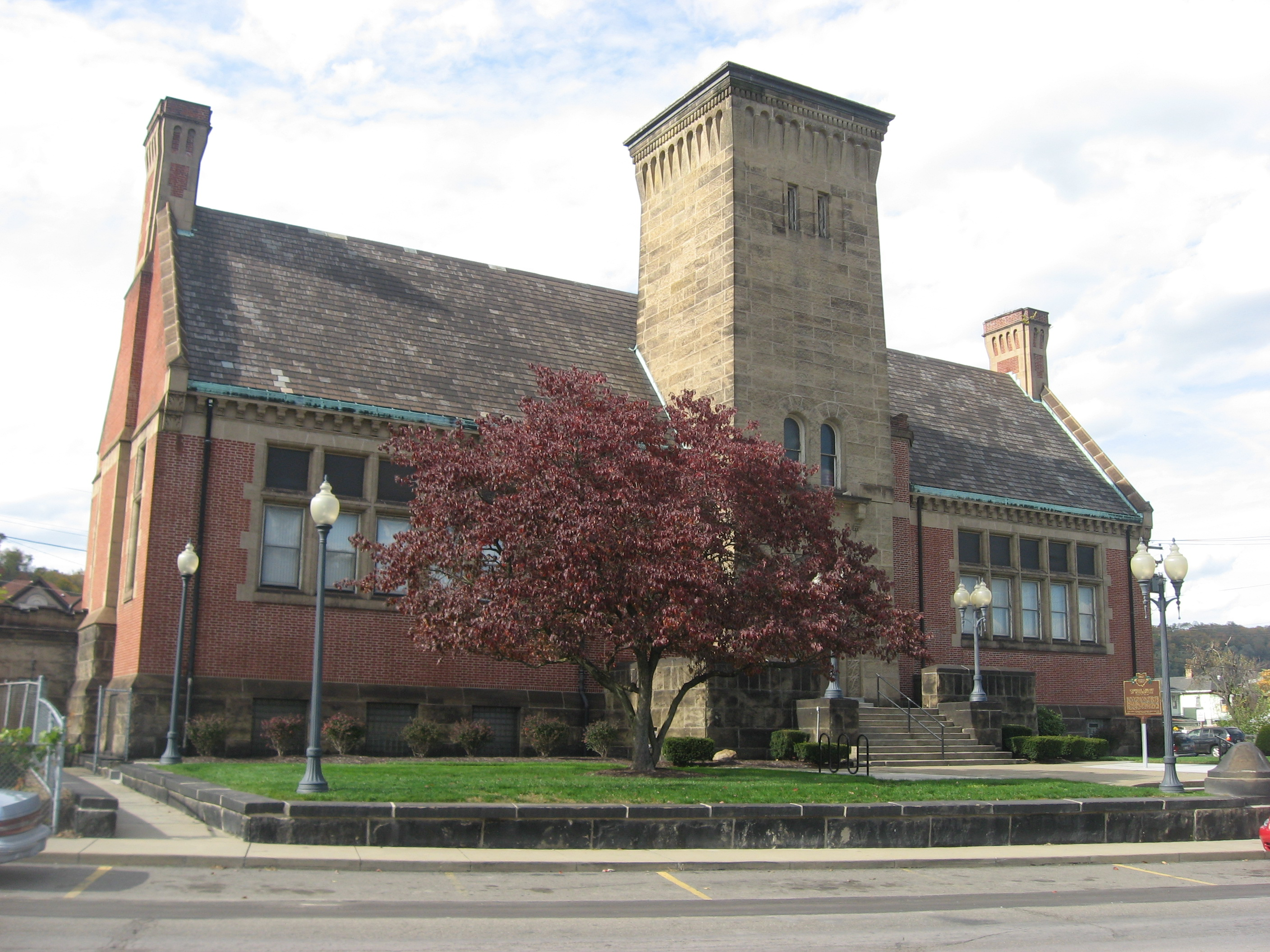
Carnegie Library of Steubenville

Steubenville has two public lending libraries, the Carnegie Library of Steubenville and Schiappa Branch Library.

Public schools in Steubenville are operated by the Steubenville City School District. There are a total of five schools in the district, including Steubenville High School. A portion of far western Steubenville is served by the Indian Creek Local School District. Several private schools are located in Steubenville. The Diocese of Steubenville operates Bishop John King Mussio Central Elementary School, Bishop John King Mussio Central Junior High School and Steubenville Catholic Central High School.

In higher education, the city is home to the Franciscan University of Steubenville, a private Catholic university founded in 1946. A second Catholic college, the College of St. Joseph the Worker, opened in Steubenville in 2024 with a focus on liberal arts and skilled trades education. Youngstown State University has operated a satellite campus in Steubenville since 2026. Eastern Gateway Community College was a public community college located in the city from 1968 to 2024.

On July 24, 2012, after being threatened with a lawsuit from the atheist Freedom from Religion Foundation, the Steubenville city council decided to remove the image of Franciscan University from its town logo rather than pay for a lawsuit. The city later proposed a logo that included a chapel and cross.

== Media ==
Steubenville shares a media market with nearby Wheeling, West Virginia. The city is home to the market's NBC and FOX affiliate, WTOV-TV. In print, it is home to the daily Herald-Star newspaper, which traces its history to 1806.

The radio station WIXZ 950 AM has broadcast Oldies music from the city since 1974. Previously, Steubenville also has radio stations WSSS-LP and WSTV (AM).
