= List of African-American arts firsts =

African-Americans are a demographic minority in the United States. The first achievements by African-Americans in various fields historically marked footholds, often leading to more widespread cultural change. The shorthand phrase for this is "breaking the color barrier".

This is a list of African-American firsts in the fine arts, popular arts, and literature. It is a wider listing than that of the major national firsts at List of African-American firsts.

== 18th century ==
=== 1746 ===
- First known African-American (and slave) to compose a work of literature: Lucy Terry with her poem "Bars Fight", composed in 1746 and first published in 1855 in Josiah Holland's "History of Western Massachusetts

=== 1760 ===
- First known African-American published author: Jupiter Hammon (poem "An Evening Thought: Salvation by Christ with Penitential Cries", published as a broadside)

=== 1773 ===
- First known African-American woman to publish a book: Phillis Wheatley (Poems on Various Subjects, Religious and Moral)

== 19th century ==
=== 1825 ===
- First African-American actor to play Othello on an English and then continental stages - First African-American star - best paid actor: Ira Aldridge

=== 1827 ===
- First African-American owned-and-operated newspaper: Freedom's Journal, founded in New York City by Rev. Peter Williams Jr. and other free blacks.

=== 1858 ===
- First published play by an African-American:The Escape; or, A Leap for Freedom by William Wells Brown

=== 1890 ===
- First African-American to record a best-selling phonograph record: George Washington Johnson, "The Laughing Song" and "The Whistling Coon."
- First female African-American to earn a military pension for their own military service: Ann Bradford Stokes.

=== 1892 ===
- First African-American to sing at Carnegie Hall: Matilda Sissieretta Joyner Jones

== 20th century ==
=== 1903 ===
- First Broadway musical written by African-Americans, and the first to star African-Americans: In Dahomey

=== 1910 ===
- First female African-American millionaire: Madam C. J. Walker
- First African-American female to be recorded commercially: Daisy Tapley (Recording source- Library of Congress)

=== 1927 ===
- First African-American to star in an international motion picture: Josephine Baker in La Sirène des tropiques

=== 1931 ===
- First African-American composer to have their symphony performed by a leading orchestra: William Grant Still, Symphony No. 1, by Rochester Philharmonic Orchestra

=== 1935 ===
- First known multethnic jazz group: Benny Goodman Trio (Benny Goodman, Teddy Wilson, Gene Krupa)

=== 1936 ===
- First African-American to conduct a major U.S. orchestra: William Grant Still (Los Angeles Philharmonic)

=== 1939 ===
- First African-American to star in their own television program: Ethel Waters, The Ethel Waters Show, on NBC

=== 1940 ===
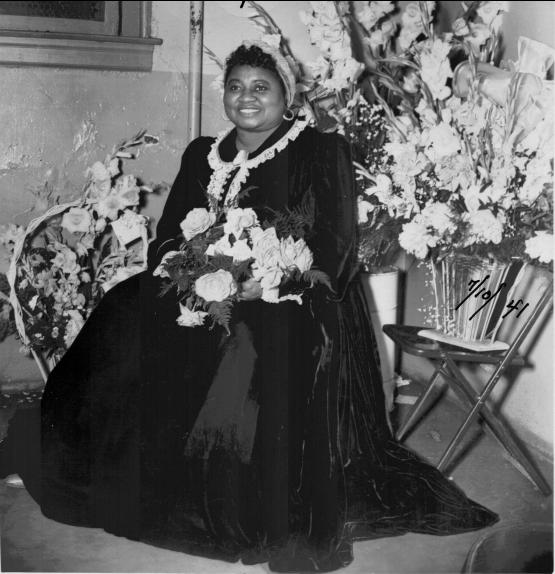
Hattie McDaniel

- First African-American to win an Oscar: Hattie McDaniel (Best Supporting Actress, Gone with the Wind, 1939)

=== 1941 ===
- First African-American to give a White House Command Performance: Josh White

=== 1943 ===
- First African-American artists to have a #1 hit on the Billboard charts: Mills Brothers ("Paper Doll"), topped "Best Sellers in Stores" chart on November 6 (See also: Tommy Edwards, 1958; The Platters, 1959)

=== 1944 ===
- First known African-American comic book artist: Matt Baker in Jumbo Comics #69 for Fiction House

=== 1945 ===
- First African-American member of the New York City Opera: Todd Duncan

=== 1947 ===
- First African-American artist to receive sole credit for a #1 hit on the Billboard charts: Count Basie ("Open the Door, Richard"), topped "Best Sellers in Stores" chart on February 22 (See also: Mills Brothers, 1943; Nat King Cole, 1950; Tommy Edwards, 1958; The Platters, 1959)
- First comic book produced entirely by African-Americans: All-Negro Comics

=== 1948 ===
- First African-American man to receive an Oscar: James Baskett (Honorary Academy Award for his portrayal of "Uncle Remus" in Disney's Song of the South, 1946) (See also: Sidney Poitier, 1964)
- First African-American composer to have an opera performed by a major U.S. company: William Grant Still (Troubled Island, New York City Opera)
- First known African-American star of a regularly scheduled network television series: Bob Howard, The Bob Howard Show (Note: While considered a network for regulatory reasons, CBS TV was viewable only locally in 1948. By 1956, CBS and other networks were viewable nationwide.) (See also: 1956)
- First African-American to star in a network television sitcom: Amanda Randolph, The Laytons

=== 1949 ===
- First African-American-owned and -operated radio station: WERD, established October 3, 1949 in Atlanta, Georgia by Jesse B. Blayton Sr.
- First African-American to sing at a presidential inauguration, performing at President Harry S. Truman's inaugural gala: Dorothy Maynor

=== 1950 ===
- First African-American to win a Tony Award: Juanita Hall (Best Featured Actress in a Musical, South Pacific)
- First African-American to win a Pulitzer Prize: Gwendolyn Brooks (Book of poetry, Annie Allen, 1949)
- First African-American solo singer to have a #1 hit on the Billboard charts: Nat King Cole ("Mona Lisa"), topped "Best Sellers in Stores" chart on July 15 (See also: Mills Brothers, 1943; Count Basie, 1947; Tommy Edwards, 1958; The Platters, 1959)

=== 1954 ===
- First African-American woman to be nominated for the Academy Award for Best Actress: Dorothy Dandridge (Carmen Jones, 1954). (Note: At that time, nominations were announced in November of the year of release, instead of early the following year.)
- First individual African-American woman as subject on the cover of Life magazine: Dorothy Dandridge, November 1, 1954

=== 1955 ===
- First African-American member of the Metropolitan Opera: Marian Anderson
- First African-American male dancer in a major ballet company: Arthur Mitchell (New York City Ballet); also first African-American principal dancer of a major ballet company (NYCB), 1956. (See also: 1969)
- First African-American singer to appear in a telecast opera: Leontyne Price in NBC's production of Tosca

=== 1956 ===
- First African-American star of a nationwide network TV show: Nat King Cole of The Nat King Cole Show, NBC (See also: 1948)

=== 1957 ===
- First African-American to win the Best Actor Award at the Cannes Film Festival: John Kitzmiller (Dolina Miru)

=== 1958 ===
- First African-American to reach #1 on the Billboard Hot 100: Tommy Edwards ("It's All in the Game"), September 29 (See also: The Platters, 1959)

=== 1959 ===
- First African-American Grammy Award winners, in the award's inaugural year: Ella Fitzgerald and Count Basie (two awards each)
- First African-American group to reach #1 on the Billboard Hot 100: The Platters ("Smoke Gets in Your Eyes"), January 19 (See also: Tommy Edwards, 1958)

=== 1961 ===
- First African-American tenor to sing leading roles for the Metropolitan Opera: George Shirley

=== 1963 ===
- First African-American to appear as a series regular on a primetime dramatic television series: Cicely Tyson, "East Side/West Side" (CBS).
- First African-American to be nominated for a Primetime Emmy Award: Diahann Carroll, for Outstanding Single Performance by an Actress in a Lead Role, for episode "A Horse Has a Big Head, Let Him Worry" of Naked City (See also: 1968)

=== 1964 ===
- First movie with African-American interracial marriage: One Potato, Two Potato, actors Bernie Hamilton and Barbara Barrie (White), written by Orville H. Hampton, Raphael Hayes, directed by Larry Peerce

=== 1965 ===
- First African-American nationally syndicated cartoonist: Morrie Turner (Wee Pals)
- First African-American title character of a comic book series: Lobo (Dell Comics). (Note: The first Black superhero, Marvel's Black Panther, introduced in Fantastic Four #52 (July 1966), is African, not African-American. This is also true of the first Black character to star in his own mainstream comic-book feature, Waku, Prince of the Bantu, who headlined one of four features in the multiple-character omnibus series Jungle Tales (September 1954 – September 1955), from Marvel's 1950s predecessor, Atlas Comics.) (See also: The Falcon, 1969, and Luke Cage, 1972)
- First African-American star of a network television drama: Bill Cosby, I Spy (co-star with Robert Culp)
- First African-American cast member of a daytime soap opera: Micki Grant who played Peggy Nolan Harris on Another World until 1972.
- First African-American Playboy Playmate centerfold: Jennifer Jackson (March issue)

=== 1966 ===
- First African-American male to be nominated for a Primetime Emmy Award and first African-American to win a Primetime Emmy Award: Bill Cosby, I Spy
- First African-American model on the cover of a Vogue (British Vogue) magazine: Donyale Luna

=== 1967 ===
- First African-American woman, and first woman, to appear on the cover of Rolling Stone magazine: Tina Turner.
- First African-American interracial kiss on network television: entertainers Nancy Sinatra (Italian-American) and Sammy Davis Jr. (African-American) on Sinatra's variety special Movin' With Nancy, airing December 11 on NBC (See also: 1968)

=== 1968 ===
- First African-American interracial kiss on a network television drama: Uhura, played by Nichelle Nichols (African-American), and Captain Kirk, played by William Shatner (Jewish Canadian): Star Trek: "Plato's Stepchildren" (See also: 1967)
- First fine-arts museum devoted to African-American work: Studio Museum in Harlem
- First African-American actress to star in her own television series where she did not play a domestic worker: Diahann Carroll in Julia (see also: 1963)
- First African-American starring character of a comic strip: Danny Raven in Dateline: Danger! by Al McWilliams and John Saunders.
- First African-American actor to star in the lead role on a TV western series: Otis Young in The Outcasts

=== 1969 ===
- First African-American superhero: The Falcon, Marvel Comics' Captain America #117 (September 1969). (See also: Lobo, 1965 and Luke Cage, 1972)
- First African-American director of a major Hollywood motion picture: Gordon Parks (The Learning Tree)
- First African-American founder of a classical training school and company of ballet: Arthur Mitchell, Dance Theatre of Harlem (See also: 1955)
- First African-American woman to appear on the Grand Ole Opry: Linda Martell

=== 1970 ===
- First African-American woman to win a Primetime Emmy Award: Gail Fisher, for Outstanding Supporting Actress in a Drama Series, for Mannix (see also: 1971)

=== 1971 ===
- First African-American to win a Golden Globe Award: Gail Fisher for Mannix (see also: 1970)
- First African-American to appear by herself on the cover of Playboy: Darine Stern (October issue)

=== 1972 ===
- First African-American superhero to feature in own comic-book series: Luke Cage, Marvel Comics' Luke Cage, Hero for Hire #1 (June 1972). (See also: Lobo, 1965, and the Falcon, 1969)
- First African-American interracial romantic kiss in a mainstream comics magazine: "The Men Who Called Him Monster", by writer Don McGregor (See also: 1975) and artist Luis Garcia, in Warren Publishing's black-and-white horror-comics magazine Creepy #43 (Jan. 1972) (See also: 1975)
- First African-American interracial male kiss (LGBTQ+) on network television: Sammy Davis Jr. (African-American) and Carroll O'Connor (Anglo-American) in All in the Family
- First African-American woman Broadway director: Vinnette Justine Carroll (Don't Bother Me, I Can't Cope)
- First African-American comic-book creator to receive a "created by" cover-credit: Wayne Howard (Midnight Tales #1)

=== 1973 ===
- First African-American Bond villain in a James Bond movie: Yaphet Kotto, playing Mr. Big/Dr. Kananga, Live and Let Die.
- First African-American Bond Girl in a James Bond movie: Gloria Hendry (playing Rosie Carver), Live and Let Die.

=== 1974 ===
- First African-American model on the cover of American Vogue magazine: Beverly Johnson

=== 1975 ===
- First African-American interracial couple in a TV-series cast: The Jeffersons, actors Franklin Cover (Anglo-American) and Roxie Roker (African-American) as Tom and Helen Willis, respectively; series creator: Norman Lear
- First African-American interracial romantic kiss in a color comic book: Amazing Adventures #31 (July 1975), feature "Killraven: Warrior of the Worlds", characters M'Shulla Scott and Carmilla Frost, by writer Don McGregor and artist P. Craig Russell (See also: 1972)
- First African-American model on the cover of Elle magazine: Beverly Johnson

=== 1980 ===
- First African-American-oriented cable channel: BET (Black Ent TV)

=== 1982 ===
- First African American to receive the Pulitzer Prize for Drama: Charles Fuller for A Soldier's Play
- First African-American woman to become a principal dancer of the Pennsylvania Ballet: Debra Austin

=== 1983 ===
- First African-American artist to have a video shown on MTV (Music Television): Michael Jackson

=== 1984 ===
- First African-American woman, and first woman to have a song reach number one on the Billboard charts at age 44: Tina Turner

=== 1985 ===
- First African-American woman, to win an MTV Award: Tina Turner.

=== 1986 ===
- First African-American musicians inducted into the Rock and Roll Hall of Fame, in the inaugural class: Chuck Berry, James Brown, Ray Charles, Sam Cooke, Fats Domino, and Little Richard
- First African-American woman, and first woman, to top the Billboard 200 year-end list: Whitney Houston (Whitney Houston)

=== 1987 ===
- First African-American woman, and first woman, inducted into the Rock and Roll Hall of Fame: Aretha Franklin
- First African-American Radio City Music Hall Rockette: Jennifer Jones
- First African-American woman, and first woman, to have an album debut at number one on the Billboard 200: Whitney Houston (Whitney)

=== 1988 ===
- First African-American, and first woman, to set a Guinness World Record for the then-largest paying 180,000 audience in a concert : Tina Turner.
- First African-American, and first person, to have seven consecutive number one singles on the Billboard Hot 100: Whitney Houston

=== 1990 ===
- First African-American woman to become a principal dancer at Houston Ballet: Lauren Anderson
- First African-American Playboy Playmate of the Year: Renee Tenison

=== 1991 ===
- First African-American nominated for the Academy Award for Best Director: John Singleton for Boyz n the Hood

=== 1992 ===
- First African-American woman to win the Grammy Award for Album of the Year: Natalie Cole for Unforgettable... with Love.
- First African-American artist, and first artist, to have an album sell a million copies in a single week: Whitney Houston for The Bodyguard.

=== 1993 ===
- First African-American woman to win the Nobel Prize for Literature: Toni Morrison
- First African-American woman named Poet Laureate of the United States: Rita Dove; also the youngest person named to that position
- First African-American to be inducted as a member of the Grand Ole Opry: Charley Pride

=== 1994 ===
- First African-American woman director of a major-studio movie: Darnell Martin (Columbia Pictures' I Like It Like That)
- First African-American woman to win as artist and producer for the Grammy Award for Album of the Year: Whitney Houston (The Bodyguard)

=== 1995 ===
- First African-American inductee to the National Radio Hall of Fame: Hal Jackson
- First African-American, and first person, to have a song to debut at number one on the Billboard Hot 100 chart: Michael Jackson

=== 1996 ===
- First African-American woman to make more than $10 million a motion picture: Whitney Houston (The Preacher's Wife)

=== 1997 ===
- First African-American actor to star in the lead role in a comic-book adaptation movie (Spawn): Michael Jai White

== 21st century ==
=== 2000 ===
- First African-American woman, and first woman, to have cumulative concert sales from 1985-2000 tours exceeding US$450 million: Tina Turner
- First African-American to be inducted into the Country Music Hall of Fame: Charley Pride

=== 2001 ===
- First African-American woman to win the ASCAP Pop Music Songwriter of the Year award: Beyoncé Knowles

=== 2002 ===
- First African-American woman to win the Academy Award for Best Actress: Halle Berry

=== 2004 ===
- First African-American to win Broadway theater's Tony Award for Best Lead Actress in a Play: Phylicia Rashad

=== 2009 ===
- First African American woman and first woman to tour full stadiums at age 70: Tina Turner
- First African-American Disney Princess: Tiana
- First African American to win the Pulitzer Prize for History: Annette Gordon-Reed, The Hemingses of Monticello: An American Family

=== 2012 ===
- First African-American to direct an animated film with a budget in excess of $100 million: Peter Ramsey (Rise of the Guardians)

=== 2013 ===
- First African-American woman, and the first woman, to cover Vogue magazine at aged 73 becoming the oldest person to appear on Vogue magazine: Tina Turner
- First African-American president of the Academy of Motion Picture Arts and Sciences: Cheryl Boone Isaacs

=== 2014 ===
- First African-American woman mainly joined the cast of NBC's sketch comedy SNL
- First African-American woman to be nominated for Best Director by the Golden Globe Awards: Ava DuVernay for Selma

=== 2017 ===
- First African-American and first person to have nail art exhibited at the Museum of Modern Art: Bernadette Thompson

== See also ==
- List of African-American sports firsts
- List of black Academy Award winners and nominees
- List of black Golden Globe Award winners and nominees
- Timeline of African-American history
