= Ted Shearer =

American cartoonist (1919–1992)

- Ted Shearer
- Born: Thaddeus Shearer; November 1, 1919 May Pen, Jamaica
- Died: December 26, 1992 (aged 73) Mount Kisco, New York
- Areas: Penciller, Inker
- Notable works: Quincy

External image
- Sgt. Ted Shearer, Public Relations Section, Hqs. Co., 92nd Division. Viareggio, Italy, December 5, 1944. Archived from the original on April 15, 2015

Thaddeus Shearer (November 1, 1919 – December 26, 1992) was an African-American advertising art director and cartoonist whose 1970–1986 Quincy was one of the earliest mainstream comic strips to star an African American in the lead role.

== Early life and career ==
Shearer was born in May Pen, Jamaica, to parents Samuel and Sophie (née Parnell), and raised from infancy in the Harlem area of Manhattan, New York City. From a young age, his ambition was to produce a comic strip. While attending DeWitt Clinton High School, he met African-American cartoonist E. Simms Campbell, who became his mentor. At 16, Shearer sold his first cartoon, to the newspaper the New York Amsterdam News. From 1938 to 1940, he studied at night at the Art Students League, on scholarship.

During World War II, Shearer served in the U.S. Army's segregated 92nd Infantry Division, reaching the rank of sergeant, and earning the Bronze Star for his position as art director for the division's magazine, The Buffalo. He provided illustrations to the military newspaper Stars and Stripes and contributed comics about military life to the newspaper syndication service Continental Features. After the war, he began doing illustrations for magazines including The Ladies' Home Journal and The Saturday Evening Post, as well as Our World and Collier's, and in newspapers including the New York Herald Tribune. From 1946 to 1947, he studied art at the Pratt Institute.

== Advertising and comic-strip career ==
Shearer's Quincy strip of March 8, 1971.

Through Continental Features, Shearer syndicated two one-panel comics, Around Harlem, about teens and young adults in that Manhattan neighborhood, and the family-centered Next Door. After those strips were discontinued in the 1950s, Shearer joined the New York City advertising agency BBDO, where he served as an art director for 15 years, winning five awards.

During this time, he sold single-panel gag cartoons to King Features Syndicate's Laff-a-Day feature. After a chance commuter-train meeting with King Features artist Bill Gilmartin, to whom Shearer showed some of his work and noted that his cartoons had been published in major magazines, an impressed Gilmartin brought Shearer's work to wider attention at the syndicate. Through King Features, Shearer launched the comic strip Quincy, starring an African-American elementary-school boy being raised by his grandmother in Harlem. It debuted on June 13, 1970. Upon launching the comic strip, Shearer left BBDO. The strip ended with Shearer's retirement in 1986.

Cartoon historian Bill Crouch, Jr. wrote that Shearer

...used Quincy to be ever optimistic and upbeat, with a sunny outlook and a white best friend [who] was a parody of the cliche, "Some of my best friends are black." ... Quincy was blessed with artwork of strong design and a creative use of ziptone. Visually, it jumped off the page at the reader. During its sixteen years in syndication, Quincy, along with Morrie Turner's Wee Pals and Brumsic Brandon Jr.'s Luther, paved the way for the current generation of successfully syndicated African-American cartoonists.

Another comics historian, Don Markstein, said the strip "wasn't preachy, the way pioneers of this type often wear their virtue on their sleeves. ... Shearer's characters were identifiably minorities in lifestyle as well as skin tones, and often derived gags from the fact, but weren't vocal advocates of change. Mostly, they were just a bunch of kids who got along together and didn't give much thought to their racial identity."

With his photojournalist son John Shearer as writer, Ted Shearer illustrated the book series Billy Jo Jive, which became the basis for animated segments on the PBS children's education program Sesame Street, and for an animated feature, Billy Jo Jive Super Private Eye, produced by Shearer Visuals in 1979.

Late in life, Shearer exhibited as a painter in numerous shows.

== Personal life ==
In 1945, Shearer married Phyllis Wildman, an attorney and, later, a deputy commissioner of social services for Westchester County, New York. The couple had a son, John Shearer (who would also go on to become a photographer), and a daughter, Kathleen.

Shearer was a founding member of the African-American professionals civic group the Westchester Clubmen, and was a member of the National Cartoonists Society and the Society of Professional Journalists.

Shearer, who lived in Pound Ridge, New York, died of cardiac arrest at Northern Westchester Hospital in Mount Kisco, New York.

== Bibliography ==
As illustrator; children's chapter books written by John Shearer

- Billy Jo Jive, Super Private Eye: The Case of the Missing Ten Speed Bike (Yearling, 1978) ISBN 978-0440410171
- Billy Jo Jive and the Case of the Missing Pigeons (Delacorte Press, 1978) ISBN 978-0440005674
- Billy Jo Jive, Super Private Eye: The Case of the Sneaker Snatcher (Dell Publishing, 1979) ISBN 978-0440405696
- Billy Jo Jive and the Case of the Midnight Voices (Delacorte Press, 1982) ISBN 978-0440007524
- Billy Jo Jive and the Walkie-Talkie Caper (Dell Publishing, 1984) ISBN 978-0440406181
