= Quincy (comic strip) =

American comic strip by Ted Shearer

- Author: Ted Shearer
- Current status/schedule: Concluded
- Launch date: July 13, 1970
- End date: October 4, 1986
- Syndicate(s): King Features Syndicate
- Genre: comedy-drama

Quincy is an American syndicated newspaper comic strip published from July 13, 1970 to October 4, 1986, created and produced by cartoonist Ted Shearer. The series, about an African-American boy being raised by his grandmother in Harlem, was one of the earliest mainstream comic strips to star an African American in the lead role, following Dateline: Danger! (1968-1974) and Luther (1969-1986). Another predecessor, Wee Pals (1965- ), features an African-American among an ensemble cast of different races and ethnicities.

== Publication history ==
Quincy strip of March 8, 1971, in which the title character gives his age. Note use of screentone effects.

The comic strip Quincy, starring a 9- or 10-year-old African-American title character being raised by his grandmother in Manhattan's Harlem neighborhood, debuted on June 13, 1970, syndicated to newspapers by King Features Syndicate. The character Quincy had been appearing in Shearer's weekly panel "Next Door" since 1962. Creator Ted Shearer, born in Jamaica, himself grew up in Harlem, although by the time he created Quincy he was living in Westchester County, immediately north of New York City. Upon launching the comic strip, Shearer left his 15-year position as an art director at the large advertising agency BBDO.

Shearer had previously sold single-panel gag cartoons to King Features' Laff-a-Day feature. After a chance commuter-train meeting with King Features artist Bill Gilmartin, where Shearer showed some of his work and noted that his cartoons had been published in The Saturday Evening Post, Collier's and other magazines, an impressed Gilmartin brought Shearer's work to wider attention at the syndicate.

The strip ended in 1986, upon Shearer's retirement.

Quincy appeared in at least a half-dozen comic-book stories, most of them written and drawn by Shearer. These appeared in three comics: King Features' school-distributed King Reading Library #R-01 (1973), the premiere of a series that took previously published content and rewrote it in simpler language for young readers or those with limited reading skills; King Features' free, promotional one-shot Let's Read the Newspaper (1974); and King Features' and General Electric's free, educational one-shot Quincy Looks Into His Future.

== Cast ==
The characters, from back cover of the collection Quincy (Bantam, 1972)

Source unless otherwise noted:

- Quincy, a young boy living in Harlem, at just above the poverty line
- Li'l Bo', his younger brother
- Granny Dixon, their grandmother, who is raising them
- Viola, Quincy's girlfriend
- Nickles, Quincy's Caucasian best friend
- Sneeze, an African-American friend who wears glasses (see illustration)

== Critical analysis ==
Cartoon historian Bill Crouch, Jr. wrote that Shearer

used Quincy to be ever optimistic and upbeat, with a sunny outlook and a white best friend [who] was a parody of the cliche, "Some of my best friends are black."... Quincy was blessed with artwork of strong design and a creative use of ziptone. Visually, it jumped off the page at the reader. During its sixteen years in syndication, Quincy, along with Morrie Turner's Wee Pals and Brumsic Brandon, Jr.'s Luther, paved the way for the current generation of successfully syndicated African-American cartoonists.

Another comics historian, Don Markstein, said the strip

wasn't preachy, the way pioneers of this type often wear their virtue on their sleeves. ... Shearer's characters were identifiably minorities in lifestyle as well as skin tones, and often derived gags from the fact, but weren't vocal advocates of change. Mostly, they were just a bunch of kids who got along together and didn't give much thought to their racial identity.

== Paperback collections ==
- Quincy (Bantam H7183, 1972)
- Quincy's World (Grosset & Dunlap, 1978; ISBN 978-0448145525)
