= Cleven Goudeau =

American art director and cartoonist

Cleven "Goodie" Goudeau
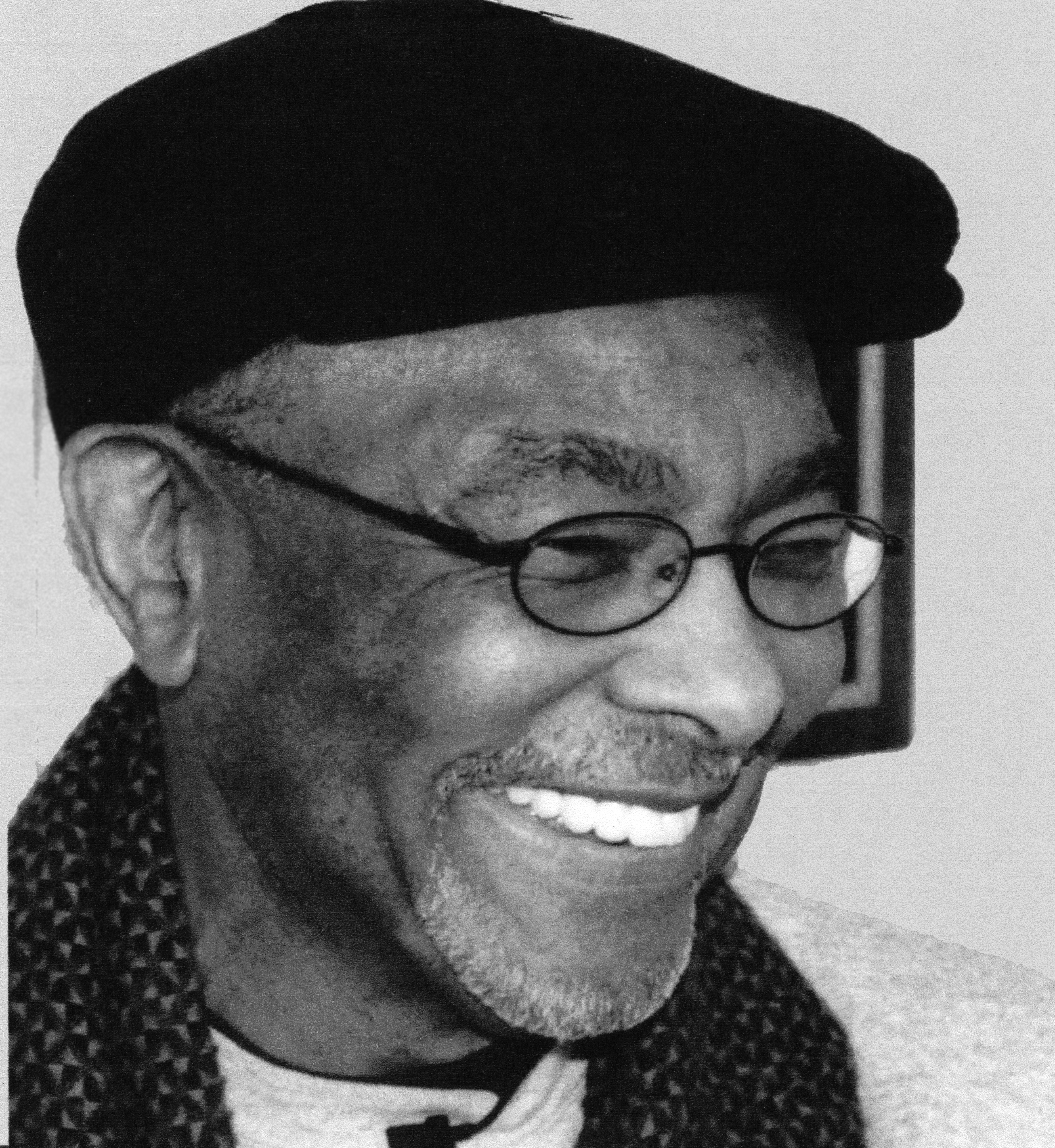
- Born: c. January 15, 1932 Hillister, Texas
- Died: January 26, 2015 (aged 83) Solano County, California
- Area: Cartoonist
- Pseudonyms: Goodall, Goodie
- Notable works: Black Santa Claus
- Awards: Clio Award

Cleven "Goodie" Goudeau (c. January 15, 1932 – January 26, 2015) was an art director and cartoonist, credited as originator of the first line of African American contemporary greeting cards. He held the record at one time for the longest card (4 feet), and produced the first nationally published card featuring a Black Santa Claus.

== Biography ==
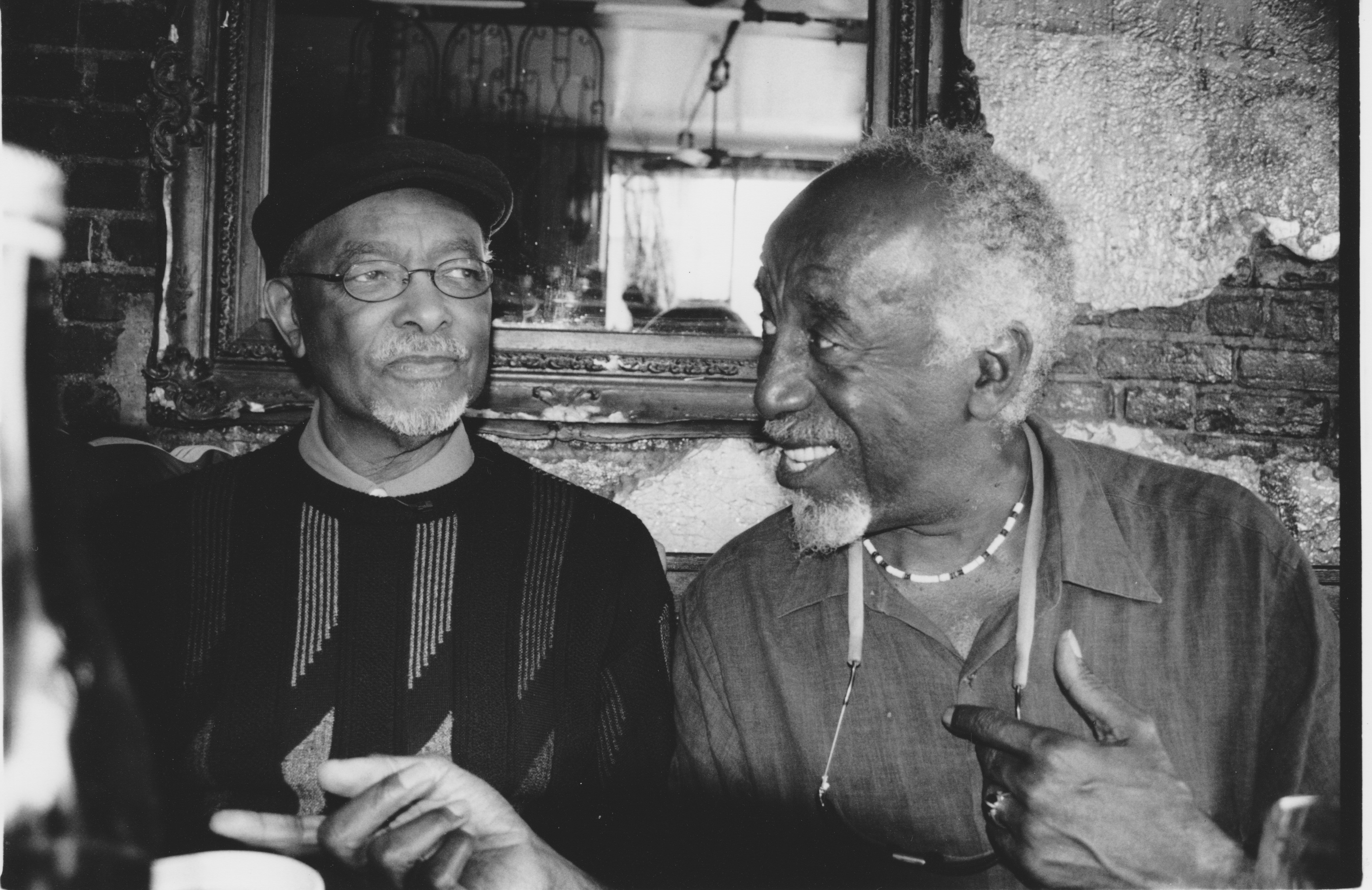
Photo taken during the making of documentary film on Cleven Goodie Goudeau by Director/Film maker T.J. Walkup

When Goudeau was 19, the manager of the shop where he worked caught him drawing on boxes in the back room, and recruited him to make some cartoons for the Naval Supply Newsletter.

After meeting Morrie Turner (creator of Wee Pals) and seeing that it was possible to make money as a cartoonist, Goudeau decided to pursue it as a profession. He published works in other U.S. Navy publications, and later worked for the Oakleaf newspaper in Oakland. He was the writer of Soul Folks and Fish Tales Cartoons.

His work was published in Playboy, and was selected by Hugh Hefner to include in a 1962 collection of favorites.

He founded the company Goodie Cards in 1962, which was in operation in the San Francisco Bay Area and New York City until 1974. The company bought Onyx Publishing in 1963, and then released Goudeau's line of greeting cards across the country, making them widely available in stores catering to people of color.

In the 1980s, Goudeau worked as an art director at the advertising agency McCann-Erickson.

Goudeau was a member of the now-defunct Northern California Cartoon Artists & Humor Association, along with Charles Schulz and Morrie Turner. He also was a member of the Society of Illustrators.

Filmmaker T. J. Walkup has been working on a documentary called "Goodie" Outlining an Invisible Man, about "Goodie" since at least 2004.

Goudeau resided in Vallejo, California, with his wife Jeanette Mcree Goudeau, and taught children cartooning as well as mentoring adults in their art careers.

Goodie died at the age of 83 on January 26, 2015. He and Jeanette had four girls: Brendalyn, Joyce, Sharon, and Clevia, and a grandson Xavier.

== Awards ==
- Clio Award, for a Coca-Cola campaign in which Ray Parker Jr.'s hit theme song "Ghostbusters" (from the film of the same name) was revised as "Thirst Busters".
