= Luther (comic strip) =

American comic strip by Brumsic Brandon Jr.

- Author(s): Brumsic Brandon Jr.
- Current status/schedule: Concluded
- Launch date: 1968
- End date: 1986
- Syndicate(s): Newsday Specials (1968–1970); Los Angeles Times Syndicate (1970–1986)
- Publisher(s): Paul S. Eriksson
- Genre(s): comedy-drama

Luther is an American syndicated newspaper comic strip published from 1968 to 1986, created and produced by cartoonist Brumsic Brandon Jr. The series, about an African-American elementary-school child, was the second mainstream comic strip to star an African-American in the lead role, following Dateline: Danger! (1968-1974), the first to do so. Another predecessor, Wee Pals (1965-2014), featured an African-American among an ensemble cast of different races and ethnicities.

== Publication history ==
A Luther strip (date n.a.) with an example of cartoonist Brumsic Brandon's satirical, race-based humor

Brumsic Brandon Jr., who published his first cartoon in 1945, did editorial cartoons before conceiving of a comic strip about inner-city African-American children and a gently satirical theme about the struggle for racial equality. He named his title character, a third-grader, after Civil Rights activist the Rev. Dr. Martin Luther King Jr.

In 1968, the Long Island newspaper Newsday began syndicating Luther through its own small syndicate, Newsday Specials, in conjunction with Reporters' News Syndicate, an initiative designed to increase minority participation in journalism, In 1970, following the purchase of Newsday by the Times Mirror, the strip became syndicated widely through the corporation's the Los Angeles Times Syndicate.

Brumsic's daughter, Barbara Brandon, who would grow up to become the first nationally syndicated female African-American cartoonist, sometimes assisted her father with such tasks as applying Letratone, a transparent sheet with dots that read in print as African-American skin tone.

== Cast ==
- Luther, a third grader
- Hardcore, his classmate, who wears a baseball cap
- Pee Wee, their friend, a kindergartener
- Mary Frances and Oreo, two African-American girls
- Lily, a blond Caucasian girl
- Miss Backlash, the third-grade teacher

The children attended the Alabaster Avenue Elementary School.

== Critical analysis ==
Cartoon historian Maurice Horn wrote that, "Although his gags were often about racism, Brandon was also successful in using his nicely designed urban inner-city kids to get his message of racial equality across."

The African-American artist and essayist Oliver W. Harrington wrote in 1976 that with Luther,

The cartoonist is actually violating what has always been an American taboo, and that is to create non-white characters or even poor white characters who are human, sympathetic and even lovable. Brandon employs his irresistible humor to level the walls of racism. And what better stage setting could he devise than the schools and the kids they're trying to educate.

== Luther collections ==
- Luther from Inner City (Independent Publishers Group, 1969; ISBN 0-8397-5650-X; ISBN 978-0-8397-5650-7)
- Luther Tells It as It Is! (Paul S. Eriksson, 1970; ISBN 0-8397-5670-4; ISBN 978-0-8397-5670-5)
- Right on, Luther! (Paul S, Eriksson, 1971; ISBN 0839770758; ISBN 978-0839770756)
- Luther Raps (Paul S, Eriksson, 1971; ISBN 0839756658; ISBN 978-0839756651)
- Outta Sight Luther (Paul S. Eriksson, 1972; ISBN 0839764812; ISBN 978-0839764816)
- Luther's Got Class (Paul S. Eriksson, 1976; ISBN 0839756682; ISBN 978-0839756682)

== See also ==
- Quincy
