= Mister Rogers' Neighborhood season 4 =

Mister Rogers' Neighborhood
- Season 4
- No. of episodes: 65

Release
- Original network: PBS

Season chronology
- ← Previous; Season 3 Next → Season 5

The following is a list of episodes from the fourth season of the PBS series, Mister Rogers' Neighborhood, which aired in 1971. It is the first season to premiere on PBS after the 1970 renaming from NET. The first broadcast of Mister Rogers' Neighborhood was on the National Educational Television network on February 19, 1968.

== Episode 1 ==
King Friday feels that babies are getting too much attention and on Prince Tuesday, he tries to limit such attention to one hour a day. Picture Picture shows us how construction paper is made.

- Aired on February 15, 1971.
- This is the first series episode to use the "Mister Rogers' Neighborhood" title. The previous three seasons had it spelled as "Misterogers' Neighborhood". The title was changed out of concern for children's spelling skills.
- This is the first episode to use "The Weekend Song" on Friday episodes as the closing song. By Season 6, the first four lines of "The Weekend Song" would later become a part of the will-be-rewritten song "It's Such a Good Feeling". The two closing songs would stay until the end of the series in 2001.
- Although National Educational Television ceased to exist as a public television network, the series was copyrighted by and distributed for NET until the end of the fourth season. The Public Broadcasting Service (PBS) succeeded NET on October 5, 1970, and inherited everything that NET had.

== Episode 2 ==
Mister Rogers and Mr McFeeley make a puppet using paper mache. Meghan Sweenie has her routine check-up. Dr. Mermelstein tells Rogers the basics of this physical operation. In the Neighborhood of Make-Believe, Prince Tuesday's crying prompts some neighbors to take action.

- Aired on February 16, 1971.
- First episode with the new neighborhood model

== Episode 3 ==
Rogers and Bob Trow make some popsicle-stick crafts.

- Aired on February 17, 1971.

== Episode 4 ==
Rogers discusses the about string quartet (e.g. violins, banjos, guitars) and hears each instrument at Negri's Music Shop. In the Neighborhood of Make-Believe, Mr. McFeely delivers a bass fiddle to King Friday.

- Aired on February 18, 1971.

== Episode 5 ==
Rogers demonstrates how music is written as well as performed. Those in the Neighborhood of Make-Believe try to play the bass fiddle, then offer their opinions on the Machine That Plays The Bass.

- Aired on February 19, 1971.

== Episode 6 (Castle Waterfall) ==
When King Friday wants to have a waterfall for his Castle garden, Donkey Hodie suggests that they install new plumbing.

- Aired on February 22, 1971.

== Episode 7 (Castle Waterfall) ==
While gymnasts perform in the Castle gymnasium, water begins to leak inside. It is revealed that one of the pipes for the Castle garden waterfall is clogged.

- Aired on February 23, 1971.

== Episode 8 (Castle Waterfall) ==
Handyman Negri and Donkey Hodie finish the Castle garden waterfall. François Clemmons visits as waterfall singer.

- Aired on February 24, 1971.

== Episode 9 (Castle Waterfall) ==
Rogers needs a washer for a fountain he wants to assemble. Instead of taking one from Bob Trow's workshop, he merely leaves him a note. In the Neighborhood of Make-Believe, the Castle fountain works only to a small extent. Lady Elaine has taken the windmill at Someplace Else apart for unknown reasons.

- Aired on February 25, 1971.

== Episode 10 (Dr Platypus training trip) ==
Lady Elaine wants her Museum-Go-Round to turn, so she harnesses X to the Museum. He doesn't want to spend all hours turning the Museum, but he does get it moving in another way.

- Aired on February 26, 1971.

== Episode 11 (Breaking and Fixing) ==
Miss Paulifficate bumps into Daniel's toy tiger and rips it, but she glues it back together. They give a letter to Dr. Bill Platypus.

- Aired on March 1, 1971.

== Episode 12 (Different types of dolls) ==
Mrs. Lawver, a doll collector, presents to Rogers her collection of antique dolls. In the Neighborhood of Make-Believe, Dr. Bill Platypus receives his lesson toward a pediatrician's license. He is to borrow a doll for the practice.

- Aired on March 2, 1971.

== Episode 13 (Paper Problems) ==
Bob Dog accidentally rips Dr. Bill's second pediatrician lesson and hides. Lady Elaine magically reverses the damage. She also gets a lesson on child care from Dr. Bill.

- Aired on March 3, 1971.

== Episode 14 (Learning by Playing) ==
After he shows some children's drawings, Rogers visits Mrs. Saunders school, talks with the children and watches them play. In the Neighborhood of Make-Believe, Mr. McFeely delivers a package from the pediatrician school to Dr. Bill. The letter says he will continue his training in Australia. Thus, the Platypus family will be leaving tomorrow.

- Aired on March 4, 1971.

== Episode 15 (Dr Platypus training trip) ==
Don Williamson visits the television house to demonstrate his radio-controlled model airplane. In the Neighborhood of Make-Believe, King Friday still doesn't want the Platypus family to visit Australia. But then he is given the right to start their flying machine.

- Aired on March 5, 1971.

== Episode 16 (Looking at Lights) ==
Rogers talks of light bulbs and replaces one of the bulbs on the traffic signal inside the television house. Two boys also discuss bird-watching with Rogers.

- Aired on March 8, 1971.

== Episode 17 (Puzzles within puzzles) ==
Rogers shows a hidden object in a drawing of the Neighborhood of Make-Believe. The neighborhood discovers an old toy that Corny used to manufacture: a toy horse in the Chatty-Cathy mold.

- Aired on March 9, 1971.

== Episode 18 (Entertainment and Camels) ==
Rogers sacrifices NOM for a visit to Betty's Little Theater. When the planned guests aren't able to appear, Betty Aberlin improvises a play with Bob Trow, Joe Negri and Audrey Roth.

- Aired on March 10, 1971.

== Episode 19 (Upside Down) ==
When the name "upside-down cake" offends King Friday, he affronts everyone with a short-lived rule that they should say what he doesn't mean.

- Aired on March 11, 1971.

== Episode 20 (Dog and Bob Dog) ==
Queen Sara asks Bob Dog to send a note asking if Henrietta Pussycat can babysit for Prince Tuesday. Bob Dog is distracted with a new rocking chair, but he finds a way to help the Royal Family.

- Aired on March 12, 1971.

== Episode 21 ==
Bob Dog wants to wear shoes so Queen Sara will like him as much as she likes Prince Tuesday.

- Aired on March 15, 1971.

== Episode 22 ==
Joe Negri displays musical instruments that are made out of junk. In the Neighborhood of Make-Believe, Lady Elaine borrows Corny's hammer without asking first.

- Aired on March 16, 1971.

== Episode 23 ==
Children act out various nursery rhymes at Betty's Little Theater. The Neighborhood of Make-Believe acts out Old King Cole.

- Aired on March 17, 1971.

== Episode 24 ==
Rogers draws a song, using paint brushes to visualize the Japanese records he plays. Later Mr. McFeely brings in a big St. Bernard dog. In between, Yoshi Ito enters the Neighborhood of Make-Believe.

- Aired on March 18, 1971.

== Episode 25 ==
Rogers builds a go-kart with spare parts. In the Neighborhood of Make-Believe, Grand-père begins to make French-fried potatoes.

- Aired on March 19, 1971.

== Episode 26 ==
Rogers and visitor Mary Sweenie talk of crafts such as needlepoint. In the Neighborhood of Make-Believe, Handyman Negri wants to have Henrietta's eyes checked.

- Aired on March 22, 1971.

== Episode 27 ==
Rogers has his eyes examined. An accident also occurs in the Neighborhood of Make-Believe, when the Trolley runs into a toy car Lady Aberlin and Corny left parked on the tracks.

- Aired on March 23, 1971.

== Episode 28 ==
Rogers plays an audio cassette that hints to a package containing a magnifying glass. In the Neighborhood of Make-Believe, King Friday gets the impression that a magnifying glass will make Prince Tuesday grow.

- Aired on March 24, 1971.

== Episode 29 ==
Rogers puts on an opera costume that includes a turban. He invites Betty Aberlin to a costume party set for the next day. Those in the Neighborhood of Make-Believe agree to a costume party to allay the doldrums.

- Aired on March 25, 1971.

== Episode 30 ==
Rogers dresses as an airplane pilot for the costume party while Betty Aberlin and Joe Negri team up to dress as a horse. The Neighborhood of Make-Believe holds its own costume party, and only the toy Horse has no costume.

- Aired on March 26, 1971.

== Episode 31 ==
Those in the Neighborhood of Make-Believe react in different ways to the presents the Platypus family, returned from Australia, had given them.

- Aired on March 29, 1971.

== Episode 32 ==
Dr. Bill Platypus invites those in the Neighborhood of Make-Believe to see his home movies about Australia. Joining them are Captain Kangaroo and all his puppet friends.

- Aired on March 30, 1971.

== Episode 33 ==
Rogers has a sign made for Bob and Judy Brown, the marionette-puppeteers who are moving in just a few doors down. In the Neighborhood of Make-Believe, Dr. Platypus moves his office to the Eiffel Tower.

- Aired on March 31, 1971.

== Episode 34 ==
Ezra Jack Keats visits Rogers to read his book "Hi, Cat!". In the Neighborhood of Make-Believe, a book editor visits Grand-père at the Eiffel Tower.

- Aired on April 1, 1971.

== Episode 35 (Jack and The Beanstalk) ==
Rogers sees Bob and Judy Brown's production of Jack and the Beanstalk.

- Aired on April 2, 1971.

== Episode 36 ==
John Reardon comes to the Neighborhood of Make-Believe dressed as an organ grinder. But hardly anybody recognizes him.

- Aired on April 5, 1971.

== Episode 37 ==
Rogers tries on various moustaches. Betty Aberlin visits to put on wigs. In the Neighborhood of Make-Believe, King Friday commissions a new opera.

- Aired on April 6, 1971.

== Episode 38 ==
John Reardon gives opera roles to Daniel and his toy, Ino A. Horse. Chef Brockett displays the monkey costume he will wear.

- Aired on April 7, 1971.

== Episode 39 (The Monkey's Uncle) ==
The Neighborhood of Make-Believe holds its opera. King Friday plays his bass for this opera, in which a zookeeper must console a down-on-his-luck organ grinder.

- Aired on April 8, 1971.

== Episode 40 ==
Rogers shows photos from yesterday's opera. At Brockett's Bakery, Rogers discusses Chef Brockett's opera role. In the Neighborhood of Make-Believe, Henrietta mopes since she didn't have a part in the opera.

- Aired on April 9, 1971.

== Episode 41 ==
Rogers and Bob Trow repair child seats and a rocking chair. In the Neighborhood of Make-Believe, Cornflake S. Pecially and Robert Troll build an infant seat for Prince Tuesday. Lady Elaine discovers how good a father King Friday is.

- Aired on April 12, 1971.

== Episode 42 ==
Susan Linn helps Rogers discussing how puppets can be used to express feelings. Her Audrey Duck character appears in the Neighborhood of Make-Believe, and scares Baby Ana Platypus.

- Aired on April 13, 1971.

== Episode 43 ==
Twins Barry Nelson and Garry Nelson visit the television house. Rogers helps Betty Aberlin play a marble game. In the Neighborhood of Make-Believe, the Nelsons help Daniel play with a ball.

- Aired on April 14, 1971.

== Episode 44 ==
Rogers talks about how things look different at night. In the Neighborhood of Make-Believe, Bob Dog and Daniel share their fears with Miss Paulifficate.

- Aired on April 15, 1971.

== Episode 45 ==
Richard Kvistad plays a kettle drum at Negri's Music Shop. In the Neighborhood of Make-Believe, Lady Elaine and Bob Dog scare King Friday.

- Aired on April 16, 1971.

== Episode 46 (Jealousy) ==
Grand-père receives a picture from his granddaughter Collette. This hurts Henrietta, who feels she is not as fancy.

- Aired on April 19, 1971.

== Episode 47 (Jealousy) ==
Susan Linn returns to Rogers' Television House, bringing her puppets Audrey Duck and Cat-a-Lion. In the Neighborhood of Make-Believe, Handyman Negri helps ease Henrietta's tangled emotions.

- Aired on April 20, 1971.

== Episode 48 (Jealousy) ==
King Friday gives Collette a key to the Neighborhood of Make-Believe. Henrietta is afraid that the key will open the door to her house.

- Aired on April 21, 1971.

== Episode 49 (Jealousy) ==
Rogers shows cake-decorating tools and sees a man decorate a cake at Brockett's Bakery. Chef Brockett takes a cake to the Neighborhood of Make-Believe for Collette. Henrietta is in the center of what happens.

- Aired on April 22, 1971.

== Episode 50 (Jealousy) ==
Rogers explains that it isn't always possible to understand what goes on in the world. He and his son make hats out of newspapers. Grand-père introduces Collette to everyone in the Neighborhood of Make-Believe.

- Aired on April 23, 1971.

== Episode 51 ==
François Clemmons is going to teach a driver's education course. To help him, Clemmons borrows the traffic signal from Rogers' television house. In the Neighborhood of Make-Believe, Daniel is instructed to wait for Mr. McFeely to deliver groceries intended for the Castle. King Friday asks Daniel to fetch his robes, which causes a quandary for Mr. McFeely.

- Aired on April 26, 1971.

== Episode 52 ==
François Clemmons returns the traffic signal to Rogers. Nurse Miller and Dr. Bill Platypus help X after he hurts one of his wings.

- Aired on April 27, 1971.

== Episode 53 ==
Cornflake S. Pecially is impatiently waiting for his new lathe. In his rush to work the lathe, Corny injures his finger in it. Nurse Miller consoles him. Rogers goes to Bob Trow's workshop to see his lathe.

- Aired on April 28, 1971.

== Episode 54 ==
The Castle is organizing a Jazz festival, and King Friday wants the best jazz musicians. Handyman Negri brings in a blind saxophonist named Eric Kloss. Dr. Bill tells all that they were not responsible for Kloss' condition.

- Aired on April 29, 1971.

== Episode 55 ==
Rogers draws a song based on a recording of jazz and classical music. In the Neighborhood of Make-Believe, King Friday is still trying to shortcut his way to playing the bass fiddle. A gold bass may be the answer.

- Aired on April 30, 1971.

== Episode 56 ==
Bob Brown, the puppeteer, shows Rogers how to make puppets from detergent bottles.

- Aired on May 3, 1971.

== Episode 57 (Babies) ==
King Friday and Queen Sara implore Lady Aberlin to baby-sit Prince Tuesday. Lady Elaine misinterprets the instructions and assigns Daniel the baby-sitting duties.

- Aired on May 4, 1971.

== Episode 58 (Babies) ==
Mr. McFeely delivers the book "Fur, Feathers, and Hair" to Rogers. Later McFeely brings in an English sheepdog. In between, King Friday is upset that baby Prince Tuesday will not smile at him.

- Aired on May 5, 1971.

== Episode 59 (Babies) ==
Rogers makes ice cream by hand-cranking. In the Neighborhood of Make-Believe, some are wondering about baby Ana Platypus's behavior.

- Aired on May 6, 1971.

== Episode 60 ==
Morrie Turner, author of the Wee Pals comic strip, visits Rogers. In the Neighborhood of Make-Believe, X begins his printing business.

- Aired on May 7, 1971.

== Episode 61 (Lady Elaine Wants Attention) ==
Lady Elaine wants people to come to her book show in the Museum-Go-Round, not to the Castle to see a chameleon.

- Aired on May 10, 1971.

== Episode 62 (Lady Elaine Wants Attention) ==
Lady Aberlin asks Van Cliburn to wear a costume for his visit to the Castle. The King and Queen are fooled until the disguised Van Cliburn plays the piano.

- Aired on May 11, 1971.

== Episode 63 (Lady Elaine Wants Attention) ==
Collette is worried that Grand-père will be lonely when she leaves for Paris. After she leaves, Lady Elaine hears Van Cliburn performing at her Museum-Go-Round.

- Aired on May 12, 1971.

== Episode 64 (Lady Elaine Wants Attention) ==
Lady Elaine wants company, but everyone is too busy for her. She is so adamant that she takes Mr. McFeely's bicycle and refuses to return it.

- Aired on May 13, 1971.

== Episode 65 (Lady Elaine Wants Attention) ==
Rogers decorates some eggs, as do the residents in the Neighborhood of Make-Believe.

- Aired on May 14, 1971.
