= Goudeau =

Goudeau is a surname, and may refer to:

- Ashton Goudeau (born 1992), American baseball player
- Cleven "Goodie" Goudeau (1932–2015), art director and cartoonist
- Jean-Pierre Goudeau (born 1933), French former athlete
- Mark Goudeau (born 1964), American serial killer, rapist, and kidnapper
- Michael Goudeau (born 1959), American juggler, writer, inventor, producer, and podcast co-host
