= Barbara Brandon-Croft =

American cartoonist (born 1958)

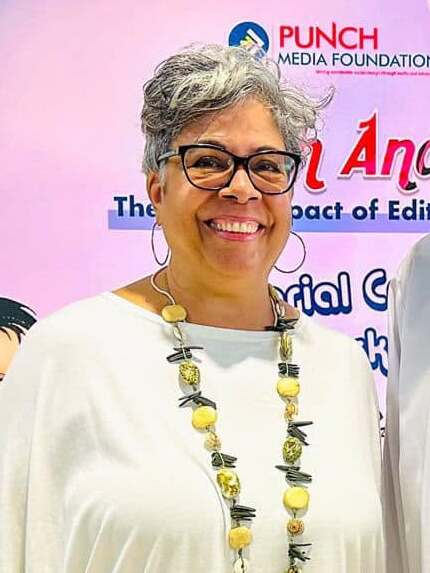
- Brandon-Croft in 2024
- Born: November 27, 1958 (age 67); Brooklyn, New York
- Occupation: Cartoonist
- Writing career
- Genre: Comic strip
- Notable work: Where I'm Coming From

Barbara Brandon-Croft (born November 27, 1958) is an American cartoonist, best known for creating the comic strip Where I'm Coming From, and for being the first nationally syndicated African-American female cartoonist.

== Early life ==
Brandon-Croft was born in Brooklyn, New York, to Brumsic Brandon Jr. Her father was also a cartoonist and he was the creator of the comic strip Luther which was in circulation from 1970 to 1986 under the Los Angeles Times Syndicate newspapers. She and her father are said to represent the only occurrence of father-daughter newspaper cartoonists.

While she was still a baby, her family moved to a predominantly Black neighborhood located in New Cassel, New York. During school desegregation, she was bused to a nearby elementary school in Westbury, New York.

She attended the College of Visual and Performing Arts at Syracuse University. In 1982, she developed a cartoon feature for Elan, a magazine for black women. She later joined the staff of Essence magazine as their fashion and beauty writer. She also created illustrations for The Crisis, published by the NAACP; as well as for The Village Voice and MCA Records.

Brandon-Croft's illustrating talent had developed naturally. Growing up she helped her father with his comics in exchange for allowance. She was first recognized for the comic strip Where I'm Coming From. She later did other illustrations including Sista Girl-Fren Breaks It Down...When Mom's Not Around. Brandon-Croft also created a line of illustrated greeting cards for OZ.

== Where I'm Coming From ==
Brandon-Croft started publishing Where I'm Coming From beginning in 1989 in the Detroit Free Press. The comic strip traces the experiences of about twelve African-American women and gives insight into the challenges of being an African American woman living in the United States. It features characters such as Alisha, Cheryl, Lekesia, Nicole and others. The characters are based on Brandon and her real-life friends.

The artwork is minimalistic. There is an absence of backdrop drawings, with the focus solely on the characters, who are represented by drawings of their upper torso. Speech bubbles are also omitted and the characters address the reader directly.

Where I'm Coming From went into national syndication in 1991 with the Universal Press Syndicate, making Brandon-Croft the first female black cartoonist to be nationally syndicated. It was the first comic strip by a black woman to be syndicated in mainstream newspapers. The comic strip was featured in more than sixty newspapers between 1989 and 2004. It appeared in newspapers throughout the United States, including Essence, The Sacramento Bee, The Atlanta Journal-Constitution and The Baltimore Sun, as well as in The Gleaner in Jamaica and the Johannesburg Drum magazine. Brandon-Croft ceased publication of the comic strips in 2005 after subscriptions dwindled.

Brandon-Croft's and her father's work are both represented in the Library of Congress and in editions of Best Editorial Cartoons of the Year.

== Personal life ==
Brandon-Croft is married to Monte Croft, with whom she has one child, Chase. She resides in Queens, New York. In 2024, Brandon-Croft would be a recipient of the Inkpot Award at the annual San Diego Comic Con.

== Exhibitions ==
- 2020 "Still... Racism in America: A Retrospective in Cartoons" (Medialia Gallery, New York City) — joint exhibition with Brandon-Croft and her father Brumsic Brandon Jr.
- 2022 "Still... Racism in America: A Retrospective in Cartoons" (Billy Ireland Cartoon Library & Museum, Columbus, OH) — joint exhibition with Brandon-Croft and her father Brumsic Brandon Jr.
- 2024 "Still... Racism in America: A Retrospective in Cartoons" (University of California-Davis Design Museum, Davis, CA) — joint exhibition with Brandon-Croft and her father Brumsic Brandon Jr.

== Bibliography ==
- Brandon, Barbara (1993). Where I'm Coming From. Andrews McMeel Publishing.
- Brandon, Barbara (1994). Where I'm Still Coming From. Andrews McMeel Publishing.
- Ahmed-Cawthorne, Francheska; Brandon, Barbara, illustrator (1996). Sista' Girlfren' Breaks It Down When Mom's Not Around. Simon & Schuster, Inc.
- deJongh, Monique Jellerette; Cato-Louis, Cassandra Marshall; Brandon, Barbara, illustrator (1997). How to Marry a Black Man: The Real Deal. Crown.
- Brandon-Croft, Barbara (2023). Where I'M Coming From. Drawn and Quarterly.

== See also ==
- Jackie Ormes
- Morrie Turner
