= John Shearer (photographer, born 1947) =

American photographer, writer, and filmmaker (1947–2019)

John Oliver Shearer
- Born: April 21, 1947; Harlem, NY, U.S.
- Died: June 22, 2019; Eastham, Massachusetts, U.S.
- Occupations: Photographer; Artist
- Years active: 1963–2019
- Spouse: Marianne Wiant (m. 1986)
- Children: 2, including Alison and William
- Relatives: Ted Shearer (father); Alison Shearer (daughter)

John Shearer (April 21, 1947 – June 22, 2019) was an American photographer, writer, and filmmaker, best known for his photojournalism, especially of "racial subjects", the funerals of John F. Kennedy and Martin Luther King Jr., and Muhammad Ali before his fight with Joe Frazier.

== Early life and education ==
John Shearer was born on April 21, 1947, in Harlem to Phyllis Shearer, an attorney who would later become the Deputy Commissioner of Social Services in Westchester County, New York, and Ted Shearer, art director of BBDO and a cartoonist who would later create Quincy. When he was in the 3rd grade, his family moved from Harlem to the Parkway Gardens neighborhood of Greenburgh, New York. When he was 8, he started to take photos. He went on to win Scholastic's photography competitions for children and be exhibited in Grand Central Terminal while in his teens. After graduating from high school, he enrolled at the Rochester Institute of Technology, but dropped out in order to do photography full-time. He wished to cover the protests around the Vietnam War, which he opposed.

== Life and work ==
In 1966, at age 20, he joined the staff of Look as a full-time staff photographer. In 1969, he left Look for Life, where he was the second African-American staff photographer after his neighbor and mentor, Gordon Parks. According to Abigail Abrams in Time, his favorite project was a story for Life about the Reapers, a gang in the South Bronx.

In 1972, Shearer was named the Photographer of the Year by the Association of Magazine Photographers. He was a recipient of the 2019 Trailblazers Award bestowed by the African American Advisory Board of Westchester County. He was exhibited at the Metropolitan Museum of Art, Museum of Modern Art, and Whitney Museum of American Art, and taught at Columbia University in the Graduate School of Journalism.

He died of prostate cancer on June 22, 2019, in Eastham, Massachusetts at age 72.

== Personal life ==
In 1986, he married Marianne Wiant, with whom he had two children: Alison and William. The couple moved to Katonah in 1990.
