= Mister Rogers' Neighborhood season 5 =

Mister Rogers' Neighborhood
- Season 5
- No. of episodes: 65

Release
- Original network: PBS

Season chronology
- ← Previous; Season 4 Next → Season 6

The following is a list of episodes from the fifth season of the PBS series, Mister Rogers' Neighborhood, which aired in 1972. The first broadcast of Mister Rogers' Neighborhood was on the National Educational Television network on February 19, 1968.

== Episode 1 ==
Mary Sweenie arrives late at Betty's Little Theater for her bird dance. X wants to read poetry alone.

- Aired on February 21, 1972.

== Episode 2 ==
Rogers and Mr. McFeely do a bit of secret communicating, with neither one understanding the other. In the Neighborhood of Make-Believe, Lady Elaine is impatient with X's call for privacy while he writes poetry.

- Aired on February 22, 1972.

== Episode 3 ==
X is afraid others will laugh at his poetry should he read it aloud. Lady Elaine is eager to hear this poetry and is already in position to hide her feelings about it.

- Aired on February 23, 1972.

== Episode 4 ==
While seeing the breads at Brockett's Bakery, Rogers learns how a bread slicer works. The Neighborhood of Make-Believe discovers a floating loaf of bread from the Owl Correspondence School. X registers himself for a course.

- Aired on February 24, 1972.

== Episode 5 ==
Bob Trow repairs Mr. McFeely's bicycle, although he is slightly embarrassed because Bob doesn't yet know how to ride a bike. This pours into the Neighborhood of Make-Believe, as Robert Troll begins to learn to ride. This also puzzles Cornflake S. Pecially.

- Aired on February 25, 1972.

== Episode 6 ==
Audrey Roth brings three unidentified cheerleaders to Rogers' television house. In the Neighborhood of Make-Believe, Cornflake S. Pecially must juggle both tasks for Miss Paulifficate and a gift for Prince Tuesday.

- Aired on February 28, 1972.

== Episode 7 ==
Rogers' son Jamie and a friend play with a toy on the floor of the television house. In the Neighborhood of Make-Believe, Robert Troll starts a game of catch, but doesn't want to throw because he thinks no one will throw back.

- Aired on February 29, 1972.

== Episode 8 ==
Rogers shows steam from a tea kettle. Mr. McFeely shows him the use of a steam engine. Robert Troll plays ball with Lady Aberlin, Handyman Negri and Daniel.

- Aired on March 1, 1972.

== Episode 9 (Pollution) ==
Corny asks Robert Troll to dump an excess amount of paint stain into a creek. The resulting pollution leaves a bad smell and tars the Castle fountain. King Friday orders Corny not to manufacture until he can clean up the mess.

- Aired on March 2, 1972.

== Episode 10 (Pollution) ==
Corny and Robert Troll need some help to clean up the paint stain that they caused. Lady Elaine uses her boomerang to return the paint to its can. Afterward, Rogers goes to the McFeelys' house and Brockett's Bakery to see what can be made from scraps of old material.

Note: This was the first show that Mr. Rogers sings (The Weekend Song/It's Such A Good Feeling) at end of the episode. This would the ending until the show ended in end of the series

- Aired on March 3, 1972.

== Episode 11 (Television) ==
Susan Linn performs her puppets, Audrey Duck and Cat-a-Lion, at Betty's Little Theater. King Friday plans to buy a large TV.

- Aired on March 6, 1972.

== Episode 12 (Television) ==
Rogers needs Joe Negri's help to get a crystal radio working. In the Neighborhood of Make-Believe, Handyman Negri has to figure out why the TV set for King Friday isn't working yet.

- Aired on March 7, 1972.

== Episode 13 (Television) ==
Rogers buys a TV set from Negri's Music Shop with a credit card. In the Neighborhood of Make-Believe, King Friday turns the new TV set on, finds a program he likes, and implores that everyone should watch it.

- Aired on March 8, 1972.

== Episode 14 (Television) ==
King Friday commands that everyone should watch a television show at the Castle. He borrows a TV set from Lady Elaine so that everyone (except him) will watch it. Bored, everyone else leans toward Lady Elaine, who has a plan brewing at her Museum-Go-Round.

- Aired on March 9, 1972.

== Episode 15 (Television) ==
Rogers goes to traffic court to plead the case that led to his parking ticket. Lady Elaine leads a march on the Castle to show that everyone has different interests.

- Aired on March 10, 1972.

== Episode 16 (X the OWL Feelings) ==
Rogers demonstrates the different sounds made from bells and crystal glasses filled with water. Joey Hollingsworth tap dances in the Neighborhood of Make-Believe. King Friday and Queen Sara present Henrietta a bell for babysitting Prince Tuesday, but it makes X jealous.

- Aired on March 13, 1972.

== Episode 17 (X The Owl Feelings) ==
Tom Flynn and the Southminister Bell Ringers perform at Negri's Music Shop. In the Neighborhood of Make-Believe, Henrietta's constant bell-ringing proves a nuisance to X the Owl. But he refuses to tell why the bell annoys him.

- Aired on March 14, 1972.

== Episode 18 (X The Owl Feelings) ==
Rogers makes a musical instrument out of an oatmeal box, a large button, and some string. In the Neighborhood of Make-Believe, Henrietta's bell goes missing. This leads Lady Aberlin to talk to a jealous X.

- Aired on March 15, 1972.

== Episode 19 (X The Owl Feelings) ==
X wants to ask King Friday for a job. He earns the title printer of Royal calling cards.

- Aired on March 16, 1972.

== Episode 20 (Pluming) ==
A plumber replaces the clogged elbow in Rogers' sink drain. The Neighborhood of Make-Believe sees the same plumber retool the Castle Fountain so it can re-circulate water.

- Aired on March 17, 1972.

== Episode 21 (Arts Foundation) ==
A magician performs part of his act at Betty Aberlin's theater. He is seen again in the Neighborhood of Make-Believe, but on harder times.

- Aired on March 20, 1972.

== Episode 22 (Arts Foundation) ==
Andrew Wyeth illustrates to Rogers the work behind an animated film based on Rogers' song "You've Got To Do It". The Neighborhood of Make-Believe establishes the King Friday and Queen Sara Saturday Foundation for the Performing Arts.

- Aired on March 21, 1972.

== Episode 23 (Arts Foundation) ==
Rogers explains the size of things by having a tailor alter a suit jacket. Those in the Neighborhood of Make-Believe donate things to the Appel family.

- Aired on March 22, 1972.

== Episode 24 (Arts Foundation) ==
Lady Aberlin is asking those in the Neighborhood of Make-Believe to donate to the new performing arts program. Lady Elaine refuses to contribute until she learns what King Friday is donating.

- Aired on March 23, 1972.

== Episode 25 (Arts Foundation) ==
Mr. Appel is named the first recipient from the Neighborhood of Make-Believe's foundation for the performing arts.

- Aired on March 24, 1972.

== Episode 26 (Mrs. McFeely birthday) ==
It's Mrs. McFeely's birthday, and Rogers isn't the only one giving presents. In the Neighborhood of Make-Believe, Lady Elaine is trying to get attention, much to the dismay of her neighbors.

This is the first series episode to use the closing song "It's Such a Good Feeling". This continued as the closing song until the end of the series in 2001.*

Mister Rogers changes his routine up to this point and ends this episode with It's Such a Good Feeling and The Weekend Song rather than his usual singing of Tomorrow: "Do you know what I feel like? I feel like singing something different before I leave today. Yeah, I've liked being with you and that's a good feeling."

Aired on March 27, 1972.

== Episode 27 ==
Attempting to make a merry-go-round, Lady Elaine doesn't feel that her animals look perfect. Rogers introduces viewers to Elsie Neal's Craft Shop.

- Aired on March 28, 1972.

== Episode 28 ==
Handyman Negri gives X the Owl a lesson in music history from the Owl Correspondence School. The record is an owl history music lesson that X has been hoping for.

- Aired on March 29, 1972.

== Episode 29 ==
Bob Dog is saddened because Daniel doesn't want him near the Clock. Still, Bob Dog wants to talk with Daniel.

- Aired on March 30, 1972.

== Episode 30 ==
Rogers takes some vegetables to Bob Trow. X the Owl wants to play the harmonica alongside the King's bass violin.

- Aired on March 31, 1972.

== Episode 31 (Fog in the Neighborhood of Make Believe) ==
Rogers helps Bob Trow inflate one tire of a tandem bicycle. Fog in the Neighborhood of Make-Believe causes Bob Dog to lose a stone intended for King Friday.

- Aired on April 3, 1972.

== Episode 32 (Astronaut Al Worden) ==
Astronaut Al Worden stops by the television house to show how his space suit works. His scheduled arrival in the Neighborhood of Make-Believe the next day, prompts various reactions from the neighbors.

- Aired on April 4, 1972.

== Episode 33 (Astronaut Al Worden) ==
Lady Elaine is prepared to go to the Moon by any means. Later in the visit, Rogers goes to the Brown Marionette studio to work on a piece with Chef Brockett.

- Aired on April 5, 1972.

== Episode 34 (Astronaut Al Worden) ==
Rogers and Al Worden recall the question-and-answer period they conducted with children about going to the Moon. Worden shows the envelope of questions he took with him on his mission. Lady Elaine turns him upside-down with her boomerang.

- Aired on April 6, 1972.

== Episode 35 (Astronaut Al Worden) ==
Al Worden shows more equipment that he took to the Moon, and he discusses the one side of the Moon that is never seen on Earth. In the Neighborhood of Make-Believe, King Friday gives Worden a model Solar System.

- Aired on April 7, 1972.

== Episode 36 (Lady Elaine Flies into Space) ==
Rogers makes a crayon rubbing of leaves. Mrs. McFeely invites him to their house to see a fern and a reptile called a caiman. In the Neighborhood of Make-Believe, Lady Elaine is still thinking about space travel. She sends Mrs. McFeely for leaves on which, Lady Elaine thinks, she can ride to Jupiter.

- Aired on April 10, 1972.

== Episode 37 (Lady Elaine Flies into Space) ==
Rogers plays with blocks and then with clay. Later he calls François Clemmons, offering him a position as voice teacher. In between, Lady Elaine insists she will fly from the Neighborhood of Make-Believe to Jupiter. She goes through a day of preparation.

- Aired on April 11, 1972.

== Episode 38 (Lady Elaine Flies into Space) ==
Mr. McFeely shows Rogers a duck. In the Neighborhood of Make-Believe, Lady Elaine commands attention as she begins her flight into space on a ship made of leaves.

- Aired on April 12, 1972.

== Episode 39 (Lady Elaine Flies into Space) ==
The Brown Marionette Company opens one room in their studio for François Clemmons to give voice lessons. In the Neighborhood of Make-Believe, Lady Elaine radios back about her flight through space.

- Aired on April 13, 1972.

== Episode 40 (Lady Elaine Flies into Space) ==
Lady Elaine radios back to the Neighborhood of Make-Believe, saying she will stay in space because she has made the most extraordinary discovery.

- Aired on April 14, 1972.

== Episode 41 (Lady Elaine's Purple Phase) ==
Lady Elaine splashes down in the Neighborhood of Make-Believe. While some think she is going to get married, Lady Elaine keeps her extraordinary discovery a secret.

- Aired on April 17, 1972.

== Episode 42 (Lady Elaine's Purple Phase) ==
Rogers hears a harpist at Negri's Music Shop. In the Neighborhood of Make-Believe, Lady Elaine announces she has discovered the Planet Purple, where everything is purple.

- Aired on April 18, 1972.

== Episode 43 (Lady Elaine's Purple Phase) ==
A purple disk drops into the Neighborhood of Make-Believe, giving Lady Elaine and others information on Planet Purple. She tries to emulate the lifestyle of all the Pauls and Paulines on the planet.

- Aired on April 19, 1972.

== Episode 44 (Lady Elaine's Purple Phase) ==
Rogers visits François Clemmons's music class. In the Neighborhood of Make-Believe, Lady Elaine is reluctant to shake off living like the Pauls and Paulines of Planet Purple. She even refuses to talk to X.

- Aired on April 20, 1972.

== Episode 45 (Lady Elaine's Purple Phase) ==
Lady Aberlin and Robert Troll must convince Lady Elaine of her rightful place in the Neighborhood of Make-Believe.

- Aired on April 21, 1972.

== Episode 46 (Snow People) ==
Chef Brockett presents snow pudding to Rogers at the bakery. In the Neighborhood of Make-Believe, Lady Elaine wants to make snow, but she can't get it just right.

- Aired on April 24, 1972.

== Episode 47 (Snow People) ==
Rogers talks about practice by showing different pairs of skates. In the Neighborhood of Make-Believe, Lady Elaine's snow-making succeeds, which doesn't exactly bear well with everyone. It does persuade John Reardon to make an opera about snow.

- Aired on April 25, 1972.

== Episode 48 (Snow People) ==
Rogers explains how only grown-ups can change light bulbs with a ladder. In the Neighborhood of Make-Believe, Lady Elaine experiments to make multi-colored snow, which backfires and plugs up the sky.

- Aired on April 26, 1972.

== Episode 49 (Snow People) ==
Rogers uses the heater for the fish tank and shows the room's radiator. He also sees that the Brown Marionette Theater is heated with a furnace. In the Neighborhood of Make-Believe, Henrietta begs for a role in the upcoming opera.

This was the final show that Mr. Rogers sings "Tomorrow" at the end of the show. It appeared once more in Episode 1459 during Mr. Rogers flashback week.

- Aired on April 27, 1972.

== Episode 50 (Snow People) ==
The snow opera features an angry girl who has interrupted a badminton game. She makes snow and turns the badminton players into snow people, but she needs help to get the snow to melt.

- Aired on April 28, 1972.

== Episode 51 (Telecan Crisis) ==
The bulb burns out in Picture-Picture, so Rogers gets a new bulb at Negri's Music Shop. In the Neighborhood of Make-Believe, the telecan kiosk by the Tree begins to bob up and down uncontrollably.

- Aired on May 1, 1972.

== Episode 52 (Telecan Crisis) ==
Mr. McFeely has been taken ill because he has been in too much of a hurry. In the Neighborhood of Make-Believe, X gets a lesson from the Owl Correspondence School.

- Aired on May 2, 1972.

== Episode 53 (Telecan Crisis) ==
Rogers talks about staying still, something that Mr. McFeely will need to practice. The same thing occurs for the telecan kiosk. Handyman Negri tries to tie it up, but that interferes with King Friday's calls.

- Aired on May 3, 1972.

== Episode 54 Telecan Crisis ==
Rogers uses a pitch pipe at his television house and with François Clemmons. Mr. McFeely demonstrates one of his sitting-still exercises. The crisis in the Neighborhood of Make-Believe is stopped in conjecture, as Rogers tells viewers they will have to decide the outcome on their own.

- Aired on May 4, 1972.

== Episode 55 ==
King Friday wants to fool Lady Aberlin and others with a marionette of the king pretending to fly.

- Aired on May 5, 1972.

== Episode 56 (Ezra Keats visits) ==
The Castle has lost its XIII plaque. It's up to Lady Aberlin and Handyman Negri to find it.

- Aired on May 8, 1972.

== Episode 57 (Mr Keats visits Make Believe) ==
Ezra Jack Keats visits the Neighborhood of Make-Believe and tells a story about a bad king. Keats must report his story to King Friday.

- Aired on May 9, 1972.

== Episode 58 (Audrey’s Feelings) ==
Rogers goes to Betty's Little Theater with an idea for Susan Linn's puppets to act out.

- Aired on May 10, 1972.

== Episode 59 (Bob Dog Feedings) ==
Bob Dog is sad that Queen Sara is too busy with Prince Tuesday.

- Aired on May 11, 1972.

== Episode 60 (The Purple Neighborhood) ==
Lady Elaine decides to turn the Neighborhood of Make-Believe purple with her Boomerang. It does not sit well with the neighbors.

- Aired on May 12, 1972.

== Episode 61 (removing Purple paint) ==
Lady Elaine has yet to remove purple residue from Grand-père's sign. But the Boomerang doesn't seem to get it off.

- Aired on May 15, 1972.

== Episode 62 (Water Skiers in make believe) ==
King Friday sends Mr. McFeely to deliver things for the water skiers who will appear later in the week. Rogers watches ballet dancers and demonstrates a musical triangle.

- Aired on May 16, 1972.

== Episode 63 (Lady Elaine helps Mr. McFeely) ==
Rogers shows that even when things are hidden, those things still exist. In the Neighborhood of Make-Believe, Mrs. McFeely and Handyman Negri look for Mr. McFeely. Lady Elaine helps a tired Mr. McFeely do his job.

- Aired on May 17, 1972.

== Episode 64 (Lady Abein helps Joe Negri) ==
The McFeelys bring two African lion cubs to Rogers' television house. In the Neighborhood of Make-Believe, Lady Aberlin helps Handyman Negri with his tasks.

- Aired on May 18, 1972.

== Episode 65 ==
Rogers and Elsie Neal make clay figures of a person and a horse. Handyman Negri and Lady Aberlin, wearing a horse costume, give Henrietta a ride. X must face his feelings about being alone.

- Aired on May 19, 1972.
