= Twin Earths =

American comic strip (1952–1963)

- Author: Oskar Lebeck (1952–1957); Alden McWilliams (1957–1963)
- Illustrator: Alden McWilliams
- Current status/schedule: Concluded daily & Sunday strip
- Launch date: June 16, 1952
- End date: May 25, 1963
- Syndicate(s): United Feature Syndicate
- Publisher(s): Dragon Lady Press, R. Susor Publications
- Genre: science fiction

Twin Earths is an American science fiction comic strip written by Oskar Lebeck and drawn by Alden McWilliams that ran in Sunday and daily newspapers from 1952 until 1963. The strip was distributed by United Feature Syndicate.

== Publication history ==
The daily strip began on June 16, 1952, the Sunday on March 1, 1953. The Sunday was drawn in a half page format, but it was available in smaller formats with dropped panels.

While semi-retired, Lebeck teamed with McWilliams (who had illustrated some of Lebeck's past books and had done work for him at Dell Comics) to launch Twin Earths. It made use of the duplicate earth concept and tapped into the growing interest during the period in flying saucers. In 1957, Lebeck retired and McWilliams assumed scripting duties for the strip.

The Twin Earths Sunday strip ended December 28, 1958, while the daily strip continued until May 25, 1963.

== Characters and story ==
The story told of another Earth (called Terra), in the same orbit as our planet but on the opposite side of the sun, whose scientifically advanced civilization visits us in flying saucers. Comics historian Stephen Donnelly noted:

The main characters of the daily strip, which began June 16, 1952, were Vana, a Terran spy living on Earth to keep tabs on our technology so the Terrans could be sure we and our war-like ways didn't pose a menace to them; and Garry Verth, an FBI agent to whom Vana revealed herself in the opening sequence. The first few months of story continuity involved a few exciting moments with Commie spies (out to get their hands on Terra's technology, of course), but mostly consisted of travelog-like views of Terran life—for example, the fact that in their liberated society, women, who constituted 92% of the population, ran things. The Sunday version began March 1 of the following year. Instead of tying in directly with the daily, or delivering a second track of story involving the same characters, this series explored a completely separate aspect of the "twin earths" scenario. It started with a young Texan named Punch sneaking aboard a Terran saucer just before it took off for home. After about three months, he was joined by Prince Torro, one of the relatively few Terran males, and the two boys continued as stars for the duration of the Sunday Twin Earths.

== Reprints ==
Most of the strips have been reprinted in magazine format. In 1987, Dragon Lady Press published one issue of Science Fiction Classics featuring Twin Earths. Beginning in 1991, R. Susor Publications reprinted most of the daily and Sunday strips in three magazines, Twin Earths (eight issues), Twin Earths Sunday Pages (five issues), and Twin Earths Special Edition (one issue)

== See also ==
- List of Twin Earths comic strips

== Sources ==
Twin Earths Special Edition #1, R. Susor Publications, 1993.
