= Mister Rogers' Neighborhood season 6 =

Mister Rogers' Neighborhood
- Season 6
- No. of episodes: 65

Release
- Original network: PBS

Season chronology
- ← Previous; Season 5 Next → Season 7

The following is a list of episodes from the sixth season of the PBS series, Mister Rogers' Neighborhood, which aired in 1973. The first broadcast of Mister Rogers' Neighborhood was on the National Educational Television network on February 19, 1968.

== Episode 1 (Is Santa Claus Real?) ==
Rogers gives a Santa Claus costume to Chef Brockett. Both Betty Aberlin and François Clemmons talk of how as children, they used to be afraid of Santa Claus. Santa Claus, himself, also comes to the neighborhood.

- Aired on February 19, 1973.

== Episode 2 (Lady Elaine and Santa Claus) ==
Rogers demonstrates how to use a microscope, and visits the Neighborhood Barber Shop for a haircut from Nick the barber. In the Neighborhood of Make-Believe, Lady Elaine is intent to cut Santa Claus' hair without his permission.

- Aired on February 20, 1973.

== Episode 3 (King Friday New Rule) ==
Rogers pretends to be a bird at François Clemmons' studio. In the Neighborhood of Make-Believe, King Friday makes another bad rule, that nobody can have bare hands. Lady Elaine doesn't take the rule seriously until a cold breeze blows by.

- Aired on February 21, 1973.

== Episode 4 (Brockett Soda Fountain) ==
Chef Brockett is planning to add a soda fountain to his bakery. In the Neighborhood of Make-Believe, Lady Aberlin brings back the toy horse which, when a string is pulled, says "I know". X gives her a toy seagull which says "you know" when a string is pulled.

- Aired on February 22, 1973.

== Episode 5 (Brockett Soda Fountain Grand Opening) ==
Rogers and several other neighbors attend the opening of the new soda fountain at Brockett's Bakery. Eric Kloss visits the Neighborhood of Make-Believe, telling King Friday how the other senses tell a blind person about the world.

- Aired on February 23, 1973.

== Episode 6 (Gifts from Collette) ==
Mr. McFeely wears a new Speedy Delivery uniform. In the Neighborhood of Make-Believe, Henrietta shows her disdain for getting Collette's old clothes, which don't fit.

- Aired on February 26, 1973.

== Episode 7 (Gifts From Collette) ==
Collette has sent dresses and hats from Paris to the Neighborhood of Make-Believe. One of the hats is too big for Henrietta Pussycat, so Lady Aberlin gives it to Queen Sara.

- Aired on February 27, 1973.

== Episode 8 (Gifts From Collette) ==
Golfer Carol Mann visits Rogers' television house to show his golf equipment. In the Neighborhood of Make-Believe, X swings his golf club, inadvertently knocking boxes out of Corny's hands.

- Aired on February 28, 1973.

== Episode 9 (X thinks he A bad Owl) ==
Rogers hears Bob Trow lead his a cappella group at Negri's Music Shop. In the Neighborhood of Make-Believe, Corny and Robert Troll want to console X.

- Aired on March 1, 1973.

== Episode 10 (The Telephone outage) ==
Rogers' telephone isn't working, so the telephone repairman makes a visit.

- Aired on March 2, 1973.

== Episode 11 (Mister Rogers as a Boy) ==
Rogers tells viewers of the time he had an imaginary friend. Daniel has an imaginary friend, Malcolm Apricot Dinko, whom he consults to decide whether he should spend the night with Grand-père.

- Aired on March 5, 1973.

== Episode 12 (Nighttime in the Neighborhood of Make Believe) ==
Rogers discusses sleep, with help from the McFeelys. Sunset reaches the Neighborhood of Make-Believe, and Daniel still doesn't believe he can to go to Grand-père's for the night. Donkey Hodie has advertised his need for a helper at Someplace Else.

- Aired on March 6, 1973.

== Episode 13 (Welcome New Friends) ==
Rogers hears a harmonica band at Negri's Music Shop. In the Neighborhood of Make-Believe, Donkey Hodie realizes that Malcolm Apricot Dinko cannot help much with harvesting the vegetables.

- Aired on March 7, 1973.

== Episode 14 (Welcome New Friends) ==
Mrs. McFeely has a cow named Harriet, and Rogers sees how Harriet is milked. A new arrival to the Neighborhood of Make-Believe, Harriet Elizabeth Cow, answers the call for help at Someplace Else.

- Aired on March 8, 1973.

== Episode 15 (Welcome New Friends) ==
Ana Platypus is beginning to speak. Harriet Elizabeth Cow is pleased to see her.

- Aired on March 9, 1973.

== Episode 16 (No One Can Ever Take Your Place) ==
Lady Elaine Fairchilde decides to make mischief at the welcoming party for Harriet Elizabeth Cow. When a splash of milk ruins the welcoming cake, some believe Malcolm Apricot Dinko is responsible.

- Aired on March 12, 1973.

== Episode 17 (No One Can Ever Take Your Place) ==
Guy Disalvo visits Rogers' television house to talk of his sugar-cube structure. In the Neighborhood of Make-Believe, Lady Elaine wants to know who Lady Aberlin likes better: Harriet Elizabeth Cow or Lady Elaine.

- Aired on March 13, 1973.

== Episode 18 (A Variety Show) ==
Lady Aberlin is dressed as a ballerina, dancing with Robert Troll to Lady Elaine's piano music.

- Aired on March 14, 1973.

== Episode 19 (A Variety Show) ==
Rogers shows crayon rubbings. Later he sees preparations for a variety show at Betty's Little Theater. In the Neighborhood of Make-Believe, King Friday wants to rush Prince Tuesday's learning skills.

- Aired on March 15, 1973.

== Episode 20 (A Variety Show) ==
Joe Negri shows Rogers at Negri's Music Shop. In the Neighborhood of Make-Believe, Lady Elaine plays an accordion in Someplace Else just to show up Harriet Elizabeth Cow.

- Aired on March 16, 1973.

== Episode 21 (A Variety Show) ==
Rogers and other neighbors participate at the talent show held at Betty's Little Theater.

- Aired on March 19, 1973.

== Episode 22 (Purple Panda Visit the Neighborhood of Make Believe) ==
Rogers visits Elsie Neal's Craft Shop, where Bill Strickland talks of making clay pots. The Neighborhood of Make-Believe sees Purple Panda, the first of a handful of visitors from the Planet Purple.

- Aired on March 20, 1973.

== Episode 23 (Purple Panda Visit the Neighborhood of Make Believe) ==
The Neighborhood of Make-Believe welcome another two new visitors from the Planet Purple, called Paul and Pauline.

- Aired on March 21, 1973.

== Episode 24 (Purple Panda Visit the Neighborhood of Make Believe) ==
Paul and Pauline command that Purple Panda broke a law by rocking in a rocking chair. As a punishment, Purple Panda cannot return to Planet Purple.

- Aired on March 22, 1973.

== Episode 25 (Purple Panda Visit the Neighborhood of Make Believe) ==
Bob Trow is working on a bird house for a wren. King Friday has a new wooden bird on a stick called Troglodytes aedon.

- Aired on March 23, 1973.

== Episode 26 (King Friday New Airplane) ==
Rogers has props for Bob and Judy Brown's production of The Three Little Pigs. In the Neighborhood of Make-Believe, King Friday wants to buy an airplane.

- Aired on March 26, 1973.

== Episode 27 (King Friday New Airplane) ==
Don Williamson shows his remote-control model airplane at Rogers' television house. Rogers forgets that the Brown Marionette Company was performing The Three Little Pigs today. Fortunately, it will be held again tomorrow. An airplane salesman visits the Neighborhood of Make-Believe. King Friday purchases a plane and wants Handyman Negri to be the pilot.

- Aired on March 27, 1973.

== Episode 28 (The Three Little Pigs) ==
Rogers attends the Brown Marionettes' production of The Three Little Pigs. King Friday gets word that his airplane will arrive tomorrow.

- Aired on March 28, 1973.

== Episode 29 (King Friday New Airplane) ==
Rogers compares the sounds of a car horn, a trumpet, and a bicycle horn. When he returns to Negri's Music Shop, he hears trumpeter Ben Benack. In the Neighborhood of Make-Believe, King Friday gets his plane and hires Yoshi Ito to pilot it.

- Aired on March 29, 1973.

== Episode 30 (Pantomime) ==
Marcel Marceau performs pantomime, both in Mister Rogers' television house and the Neighborhood of Make-Believe.

- Aired on March 30, 1973.

== Episode 31 (Daniel's Birthday) ==
Daniel's birthday is coming Friday, and he asks for, among other things, a truck.and mr Rogers shows a video of his uncle and His Cousins in the army

- Aired on April 2, 1973.

== Episode 32 (Daniel's Birthday) ==
Daniel Striped Tiger shares his birthdate with Purple Panda.

- Aired on April 3, 1973.

== Episode 33 (Daniel's Birthday) ==
Al Worden shares one of his poems with Rogers. In the Neighborhood of Make-Believe, Daniel wonders if he has made a mistake giving his birthdate to Purple Panda.

- Aired on April 4, 1973.

== Episode 34 (Daniel's Birthday) ==
Rogers finds beauty in a rainy day. In the Neighborhood of Make-Believe, Purple Panda overcomes his fear of the rain.

- Aired on April 5, 1973.

== Episode 35 (Daniel's Birthday) ==
Rogers visits a lapidarian, who shows how stones are polished. Astronaut Al Worden, who flew to the Moon on the Apollo 15 mission, shows a Moon rock in Rogers' kitchen. The Neighborhood of Make-Believe celebrates Daniel's and Purple Panda's birthday.

- Aired on April 6, 1973.

== Episode 36 (Potato Bugs and Cows) ==
Rogers works a typewriter specifically used with teleprompters. In the Neighborhood of Make-Believe, Pilot Ito wants to take opera lessons. King Friday calls John Reardon in to teach her.

- Aired on April 9, 1973.

== Episode 37 (Potato Bugs and Cows) ==
Rogers visits the dentist. In the Neighborhood of Make-Believe, John Reardon agrees to give Pilot Ito opera lessons. King Friday commissions an opera for Friday.

- Aired on April 10, 1973.

== Episode 38 (Potato Bugs and Cows) ==
Rogers shows a book with pictures of the teeth of various animals. Mr. McFeely brings in animal-sound instruments. In the Neighborhood of Make-Believe, John Reardon gives opera parts to Lady Aberlin and Harriet Elizabeth Cow.

- Aired on April 11, 1973.

== Episode 39 (Potato Bugs and Cows) ==
Rogers shows different kinds of potatoes and shows what happens if they are put in water for a while. He makes up a potato song. Mr. McFeely delivers an ocarina. At the Negri's Music Shop, a blue grass band is rehearsing and explains why their music is bluegrass. Chef Brockett plays an ocarina and decides to be a potato bug in the opera. John Reardon and Lady Aberlin are still planning the opera and need a king and a pilot. King Friday decides he can't be in the opera. François Clemmons will make a good king, and Miss Ito can be a pilot.

- Aired on April 12, 1973.

== Episode 40 (Potato Bugs and Cows) ==
The Neighborhood of Make-Believe holds its opera on Potato Bugs and Cows. Lady Aberlin plays Priscilla, an unsatisfied cow who wants to be a potato bug.

- Aired on April 13, 1973.
- A segment of Fred's discussion about Priscilla Cow's emotion had a cameo on a television screen in the 1995 film Casper.

== Episode 41 (Queen Sara not feeling well) ==
Rogers hears that Mrs. McFeely is ill. In the Neighborhood of Make-Believe, Queen Sara begins to fall ill.

- Aired on April 16, 1973.

== Episode 42 (Queen Sara not feeling well) ==
Rogers visits Mrs. McFeely. In the process, both express their feelings about her illness. In the Neighborhood of Make-Believe, Lady Elaine and Bob Dog show off their bravery.

- Aired on April 17, 1973.

== Episode 43 (Queen Sara not feeling well) ==
Susan Linn uses her Cat-a-lion puppet to express sad and happy feelings. In the Neighborhood of Make-Believe, Handyman Negri announces the Queen's illness.

- Aired on April 18, 1973.

== Episode 44 (Queen Sara not feeling well) ==
Those in the Neighborhood of Make-Believe decide to play music to help Queen Sara get well.

- Aired on April 19, 1973.

== Episode 45 (Queen Sara not feeling well) ==
Rogers has a juicer for Chef Brockett. Those in the Neighborhood of Make-Believe hold a concert to celebrate Queen Sara's recovery from illness.

- Aired on April 20, 1973.

== Episode 46 (What is Love?) ==
X gives leaves for Queen Sara to examine under her microscope.

- Aired on April 23, 1973.

== Episode 47 (What is Love?) ==
Rogers helps the McFeelys pack for their upcoming trip to see their grandchildren. In the Neighborhood of Make-Believe, Lady Aberlin wants Queen Sara to identify a leaf.

- Aired on April 24, 1973.

== Episode 48 (What is Love?) ==
Rogers meets a woman who makes toys from wood. In the Neighborhood of Make-Believe, King Friday is dismayed that Harriet Elizabeth Cow has refused to give him her plant. This prompts an argument between King Friday and Queen Sara.

- Aired on April 25, 1973.

== Episode 49 (What is Love?) ==
Lady Aberlin wants to know how love works.

- Aired on April 26, 1973.

== Episode 50 (What is Love?) ==
As he takes care of Mrs. McFeely's plants, Rogers says that new plants start from seeds. In the Neighborhood of Make-Believe, Henrietta and Miss Paulifficate imagine what the McFeelys might be doing.

- Aired on April 27, 1973.

== Episode 51 (The McFeelys return home) ==
Rogers welcomes back the McFeelys. They share photographs of their grandchildren. In the Neighborhood of Make-Believe, Lady Elaine shows her impatience for Mr. McFeely's return.

- Aired on April 30, 1973.

== Episode 52 (Feelings) ==
Rogers has a ukulele he wants Joe Negri to sell. In the Neighborhood of Make-Believe, Henrietta and Lady Elaine are at odds: both wishes she could be the other.

- Aired on May 1, 1973.

== Episode 53 (Feelings) ==
Henrietta is still stinging from her argument with Lady Elaine. Handyman Negri must console both of them.

- Aired on May 2, 1973.

== Episode 54 (Rocking Throne) ==
King Friday wants Mr. McFeely to order a rocking throne. But Corny is having his nap.

- Aired on May 3, 1973.

== Episode 55 (Rocking Throne) ==
Corny and Miss Paulifficate put the finishing touches on King Friday's rocking throne.

- Aired on May 4, 1973.

== Episode 56 (Mixed-up NOM) ==
Bob Trow helps the McFeelys wallpaper their kitchen. In the Neighborhood of Make-Believe, Lady Elaine uses her boomerang to rearrange the buildings and even adds wallpaper to the castle.

- Aired on May 7, 1973.

== Episode 57 (Mixed-up NOM) ==
Rogers takes a wallpapered container to the McFeelys, who have finished wallpapering their house. In the Neighborhood of Make-Believe, everyone is confused over the rearranged locales.

- Aired on May 8, 1973.

== Episode 58 (Mixed-up NOM) ==
Bob Trow demonstrates several tools. In the Neighborhood of Make-Believe, everyone is angry at Lady Elaine. Pilot Ito and Lady Aberlin do their best to remedy the rearrangements.

- Aired on May 9, 1973.

== Episode 59 (Mixed-up NOM) ==
Rogers talks to a glassblower at Elsie Neal's Craft Shop. Lady Elaine moves all the locales back where they belong. King Friday commissions a Festival of Mad Feelings for the next day.

- Aired on May 10, 1973.

== Episode 60 (Festival of Mad Feelings) ==
Rogers visits a drummer in Negri's Music Shop. The Neighborhood of Make-Believe holds its Festival of Mad Feelings.

- Aired on May 11, 1973.

== Episode 61 (Morrie Turner visits) ==
Morrie Turner, a cartoonist, shows Rogers pictures of several neighbors. Mr. McFeely announces that his grandchildren will visit the neighborhood soon.

- Aired on May 14, 1973.

== Episode 62 (Mr. McFeely grandchildren visit) ==
Rogers tries on leg braces and works crutches before he visits Chrissie Thompson and Mrs. McFeely. In the Neighborhood of Make-Believe, Mr. McFeely helps Donkey Hodie put the finishing touches on his invention.

- Aired on May 15, 1973.

== Episode 63 (Donley Hodie starr) ==
Audrey Roth shows Rogers a new game she created. In the Neighborhood of Make-Believe, Grand-père compliments Donkey Hodie for his potato crop.

- Aired on May 16, 1973.

== Episode 64 (Daniel Sleeps Away from Home) ==
Rogers talks about and draws different kinds of stars. Nighttime in the Neighborhood of Make-Believe sees Daniel and Grand-père making a star for Donkey Hodie.

- Aired on May 17, 1973.

== Episode 65 (The Music Box) ==
Rogers hears a barbershop quartet at Negri's Music Shop. Lady Elaine starts a vocal chorale with Harriet Elizabeth Cow and Lady Aberlin.

- Aired on May 18, 1973.
- This is the last series episode to use the original city model, in which it had been in use since Season 1.
