= Alison Shearer =

- Genres: Jazz; Jazz Fusion; Classical; R&B; Hip Hop
- Occupations: Musician; Composer

Alison Shearer is an American jazz musician and composer.

== Early life and education ==
Shearer's father, John Shearer, was a photojournalist for TIME and Look capturing the upheaval of the 1960s. She attended school in Westchester, NY and later the Manhattan School of Music.

== Musical career ==
Shearer graduated from Manhattan School of Music, where she studied with Dick Oatts, Steve Wilson, and Vincent Herring. In 2010 she co-founded PitchBlak Brass Band, a brass band fusing New Orleans traditions with hip-hop, which toured internationally. In 2015 she founded the Alison Shearer Quartet. She released her first self-titled debut album View from Above, in 2022 with her quartet and was subsequently described as a force on the rise by JazzTimes. Shearer released her second album with her quartet on Pinch Records in October 2025.

Shearer performed on NPR’s Jazz Night in America in 2022 and on NPR's Tiny Desk Concerts series in 2024. She has toured internationally with Red Baraat, Wild Wild East, Pitchblak Brass Band and her eponymous quartet.

== Discography ==
- In The Garden Alison Shearer (Pinch Records, 2025)
- View From Above Alison Shearer (2022)
