= Oskar Lebeck =

American stage designer and illustrator (1903–1966)

Oskar Lebeck (August 30, 1903 – December 20, 1966) was a stage designer and an illustrator, writer and editor (mostly of children's literature) who is best known for his role in establishing Dell Comics during the 1930s and 1940s period known as the Golden Age of Comic Books.

== Early career ==
Lebeck was born in Mannheim, Grand Duchy of Baden, German Empire. He did stage design for Max Reinhardt in Germany. Moving to the United States in 1930 he did similar work for the Broadway productions of Florenz Ziegfeld and Earl Carroll. By the mid-1930s he was working as an industrial designer of textiles and furniture while also writing (and sometimes illustrating) children's books, mostly for Grosset & Dunlap. Titles included The Diary of Terwilliger Jellico (1935); The Story of the Automobile City (1936) and Clementina the Flying Pig (1939); in addition he illustrated an abridgement of The Wonderful Wizard of Oz published in 1939.

== Dell Comics ==
In 1938, Western Publishing hired him as an art director/managing editor to help launch its line of comic books, financed and distributed by Dell. Lebeck oversaw Western's New York editorial office. Notably he hired Walt Kelly who became one of the star creators of the line, best known for originating Pogo while there. Lebeck also selected John Stanley to bring panel cartoon character Little Lulu to comic books.

Writer Gaylord Du Bois described Lebeck as "a man of immense drive [who] had a way of developing the best ability and the fervent loyalty of the artists and writers who worked under him". Du Bois co-authored with Lebeck three adventure novels for children in 1941: Stratosphere Jim and His Flying Fortress; Rex, King of the Deep; and The Hurricane Kids on the Lost Islands. Although the latter at the end mentions a sequel (The Hurricane Kids in the Canyon of Cliff Dwellers) it was never published.

Artist/Writer Dan Noonan in a 1968 interview reminisced about his time working for Lebeck at Western Publishing in the 1940s: "Lebeck was a wonderful man to work for, and he was really the only comic book impresario that, in my opinion, ever deserved the name.... Lebeck had quite a flair for design; the Bauhaus was still not so distant in people's minds that it wasn't acceptable, and I think that's where his work might have been influenced. He had a wide open mind for ideas; he initiated Animal Comics, a fairy story comic book, and these Raggedy Ann comics at the end of the war. And many other titles that were one-shots. Just about everything he did turned out rather well".

Comic book historian Michael Barrier has commented that the aforementioned fairy tale, nursery rhyme and similarly themed titles "represented an effort by Lebeck, who had written and drawn children's books in the 1930s, to bring to comic books some of the qualities of traditional children's books, especially through rich and rather old-fashioned illustrations". Similar high aspirations inform Lebeck's introduction for the short-lived Famous Stories series with his hopes that its adaptation of classic novels "told through a new and vivid medium, will recommend itself to parents and teachers everywhere, as well as to the boys and girls for whom it was created".

One interesting sidelight is that in many cases Lebeck held the copyright of the non-licensed titles Dell published in that era, an unusual practice in the comic book industry. When asked about this Noonan stated, "I'd imagine that it was some understanding they had – Oskar was responsible for bringing up the sales of their comic book division, and I think this might have been part of his reward; he held these copyrights. And if there was any re-use of the material, he'd receive royalties".

== Later life ==
Lebeck left Western in 1949, although he continued to work for the company as a consultant. While semi-retired he teamed with artist Alden McWilliams (who had illustrated some of Lebeck's past books and had done work for him at Dell) to launch on June 16, 1952 the science fiction daily comic strip Twin Earths (with a Sunday version added March 1, 1953). It made use of the duplicate earth concept and tapped into the growing interest in flying saucers during that period. In 1957 Lebeck retired fully and McWilliams assumed scripting duties for the strip. That same year Dell published a comic book adaptation of Clementina as the ninth issue of Dell Junior Treasury.

Lebeck died in 1966 at his home in La Jolla, California. Some of Lebeck's correspondence with his agent Toni Mendez is included in the Toni Mendez Collection at Ohio State University's Billy Ireland Cartoon Library & Museum
