= List of Twin Earths comic strips =

This is a list of Twin Earths comic strips.

== Twin Earths Daily strips ==
- D01 - “Spy From Another Earth” (6-16-52 to 9-13-52)
- D02 - “Agents of Terra” (9-15-52 to 1-17-53)
- D03 - “Space Station From Terra” (1-19-53 to 5-16-53)
- D04 - “Marco Polo of Space” (5-18-53 to 9-28-53)
- D05 - “Prisoners of the Secret Police” (9-29-53 to 12-7-53)
- D06 - “Aquarius” (12-8-53 to 3-22-54)
- D07 - “Invasion of the Space Pygmies” (3-23-54 to 5-22-54)
- D08 - “Twin Earths Solidarity” (5-24-54 to 8-14-54)
- D09 - “The Syndicate” (8-16-54 to 11-4-54)
- D10 - “The Mysterious Missiles” (11-5-54 to 12-14-54)
- D11 - “Marooned In Space” (12-15-54 to 1-29-55)
- D12 - “Invisible Visitor From Space” (1-31-55 to 5-21-55)
- D13 - “Stolen Rocket Plans” (5-23-55 to 8-22-55)
- D14 - “Moonlet Station” (8-23-55 to 11-2-55)
- D15 - “Omnimach” (11-3-55 to 2-4-56)
- D16 - “Prehistoric Planet” (2-6-56 to 6-18-56)
- D17 - “A Glimpse of the Future” (6-19-56 to 9-1-56)
- D18 - “The Strange Case of ‘Birdy’ Murphy” (9-3-56 to 10-29-56)
- D19 - “The World of Tomorrow” (10-30-56 to 2-12-57)
- D20 - “Shanghaied” (2-13-57 to 4-5-57)
- D21 - “Raiders” (4-6-57 to 5-11-57)
- D22 - “Nemesis” (5-13-57 to 8-8-57)
- D23 - “Mystery Sphere” (8-9-57 to 11-2-57)
- D24 - “Terranian Doubles” (11-4-57 to 1-29-58)
- D25 - “The Outer Orbit Project” (1-30-58 to 4-25-58)
- D26 - “Junior Satellite Project” (4-26-58 to 5-17-58)
- D27 - “Mysterious Moon Domes” (5-19-58 to 7-12-58)
- D28 - “The Secret of the Moon Colony” (7-14-58 to 9-13-58)
- D29 - “The Great Brain Robberies” (9-15-58 to 11-8-58)
- D30 - “The Venusian Vest” (11-10-58 to 3-14-59)
- D31 - “Agents From Venus” (3-16-59 to 6-13-59)
- D32 - “Intrigue on Venus” (6-15-59 to 9-19-59)
- D33 - “Stolen Submarine Plans” (9-21-59 to 11-21-59)
- D34 - “Space Ship Columbus” (11-23-59 to 2-18-60)
- D35 - “Terra Invaded” (2-19-60 to 4-26-60)
- D36 - “Terranian Island Stronghold” (4-27-60 to 6-23-60)
- D37 - “Cristal's Castle” (6-24-60 to 8-22-60)
- D38 - “The Poison Bomb Experiment” (8-23-60 to 10-15-60)
- D39 - “Alien Spy” (10-17-60 to 12-3-60)
- D40 - “The City of Tule” (12-5-60 to 1-21-61)
- D41 - “The City of Oceana” (1-23-61 to 3-11-61)
- D42 - “Marooned in Space” (3-13-61 to 4-24-61)
- D43 - “Homecoming” (4-25-61 to 7-1-61)
- D44 - “Moon Shot” (7-3-61 to 8-26-61)
- D45 - “Return to Terra” (8-28-61 to 10-21-61)
- D46 - “Black-Market Operation” (10-23-61 to 11-25-61)
- D47 - “Mission to Mars” (11-27-61 to 1-19-62)
- D48 - “The Lost Space Ship” (1-20-62 to 3-24-62)
- D49 - “Blackmail” (3-26-62 to 5-12-62)
- D50 - “The Reluctant Bride” (5-14-62 to 7-7-62)
- D51 - “Billion Dollar Empire” (7-9-62 to 9-1-62)
- D52 - “The Most Beautiful Girl on Terra” (9-3-62 to 10-15-62)
- D53 - “Island of Abuc” (10-16-62 to 11-15-62)
- D54 - “Kidnapped” (11-16-62 to 12-25-62)
- D55 - “Maris Needs Men” (12-26-62 to 2-9-63)
- D56 - “The Telvifone Thief” (2-11-63 to 4-6-63)
- D57 - “Back in Time” (4-8-63 to 5-25-63)

== Twin Earths story arcs ==
- S01 - “The Hitchhiker” (3-1-53 to 5-24-53)
- S02 - “A Prince of Terra” (5-31-53 to 7-26-53)
- S03 - “Lost on the Earthmoon” (8-2-53 to 8-30-53)
- S04 - “The Ghost Rocket” (9-6-53 to 11-29-53)
- S05 - “The Forgotten Islands of Terra” (12-6-53 to 4-4-54)
- S06 - “Space Pygmies!” (4-11-54 to 7-18-54)
- S07 - “The Abandoned Cruise Ship” (7-25-54 to 10-31-54)
- S08 - “Island Refuge” (11-7-54 to 2-13-55)
- S09 - “Lost in Space” (2-20-55 to 5-8-55)
- S10 - “Colossus” (5-15-55 to 2-12-56)
- S11 - “The Moon of Colossus” (2-19-56 to 7-15-56)
- S12 - “In Earth's Past” (7-22-56 to 3-24-57)
- S13 - “Pirates of Miami” (3-31-57 to 5-26-57)
- S14 - “The Tyrant of Terra” (6-2-57 to 9-29-57)
- S15 - “The Space Colonizer” (10-6-57 to 1-5-58)
- S16 - “The Moon Colony” (1-12-58 to 3-16-58)
- S17 - “Visit to Earth” (3-23-58 to 7-13-58)
- S18 - “The Kingdom of the Aquariats” (7-20-58 to 12-7-58)
