= Brumsic Brandon Jr. =

American newspaper cartoonist

- Brumsic Brandon Jr.
- Born: April 10, 1927 Washington, D.C., U.S.
- Died: November 28, 2014 (aged 87) Cocoa Beach, Florida, U.S.
- Areas: Penciller, Inker
- Notable works: Luther

Brumsic Brandon Jr. (April 10, 1927 – November 28, 2014) was an African-American cartoonist whose 1969-1986 Luther was one of the earliest mainstream comic strips to feature an African American in the lead role.

== Early life and career ==
Brandon Jr. was born in Washington, D.C., on April 10, 1927, the second of five children born to Brumsic Brandon Sr., a Washington Union Station porter, and Pearl Brooks Brandon. He attended school in the segregated Armstrong public school district. While still a teen, with his art ambitions supported by family and a high school art teacher, Brandon began submitting comic-strip ideas to newspapers. After studying art at New York University, he was drafted into the U.S. Army. Following two years of service in post-World War II occupied Germany, where he reached the rank of sergeant, he returned to New York City and drew comics after his workdays in various jobs. His employers included RCA and Bray Studios, where he worked as an animator.

A Luther strip (date n.a.) with an example of Brandon's satirical, race-based humor

He published his first cartoon in 1945, and drew editorial cartoons as well as caricatures, some of which were collected in the 1966 book Damned If We Do, and Damned If We Don't, published by the San Jose, California chapter of the Civil Rights organization CORE and the Santa Clara Valley Friends of SNCC.

== Luther and television ==
He then conceived of Luther, a comic strip about inner-city African-American children, imbued with a gently satirical theme about the struggle for racial equality. He named his title character, a third-grader, after Civil Rights activist the Rev. Dr. Martin Luther King Jr. In 1968, the Long Island newspaper Newsday began syndicating Luther through its own small syndicate, Newsday Specials, in conjunction with Reporters' News Syndicate, an initiative designed to increase minority participation in journalism. In 1970, following the purchase of Newsday by Times Mirror, the strip became syndicated widely through the corporation's Los Angeles Times Syndicate.

In the early 1970s, Brandon appeared as himself, a.k.a. Mr. B.B., drawing and giving simple art lessons on the locally produced, WPIX-TV children's television program Joya's Fun School in New York City.

Following the June 1986 discontinuation of Luther upon Brandon's retirement, Brandon contributed political cartoons and op-ed pieces to the Brevard County, Florida, newspaper Florida Today.

== Personal life ==
In 1959, Brandon moved with his family to New Cassel, New York, a Long Island hamlet adjacent to Westbury, New York. Afterward, they lived in the Pocono Mountains area before finally settling in Florida for more than 25 years. He was married to his wife Rita for 64 years at the time of his death. The couple had three children: Barbara Brandon, a.k.a. Barbara Brandon-Croft, who would become the first nationally syndicated female African-American cartoonist, Linda, and a son, Brumsic Brandon III. The family was unsure of the origin of the name Brumsic, with unconfirmed family lore speculating it might be derived from "Brunswick".

He died in Cocoa Beach, Florida, of complications from Parkinson's disease. He had four siblings: Grievance, who predeceased him, Yvonne, Waliakbar Muhammad, and Ivan.

== Bibliography ==
Luther collections:

- Luther from Inner City (Independent Publishers Group, 1969; ISBN 0-8397-5650-X; ISBN 978-0-8397-5650-7)
- Luther Tells It as It Is! (Paul S. Eriksson, 1970; ISBN 0-8397-5670-4; ISBN 978-0-8397-5670-5)
- Right on, Luther! (Paul S, Eriksson, 1971; ISBN 0839770758; ISBN 978-0839770756)
- Luther Raps (Paul S, Eriksson, 1971; ISBN 0839756658; ISBN 978-0839756651)
- Outta Sight Luther (Paul S. Eriksson, 1972; ISBN 0839764812; ISBN 978-0839764816)
- Luther's Got Class (Paul S. Eriksson, 1976; ISBN 0839756682; ISBN 978-0839756682)

== Exhibitions ==
- 2020 "Still... Racism in America: A Retrospective in Cartoons" (Medialia Gallery, New York City) — posthumous joint exhibition with Brandon's daughter Barbara Brandon-Croft
- 2022 "Still... Racism in America: A Retrospective in Cartoons" (Billy Ireland Cartoon Library & Museum, Columbus, OH) — joint exhibition with Brandon-Croft and her father Brumsic Brandon Jr.
- 2024 "Still... Racism in America: A Retrospective in Cartoons" (University of California-Davis Design Museum, Davis, CA) — joint exhibition with Brandon-Croft and her father Brumsic Brandon Jr.

== See also ==
- Wee Pals
