= Lucy Terry =

American poet (c. 1733–1821)

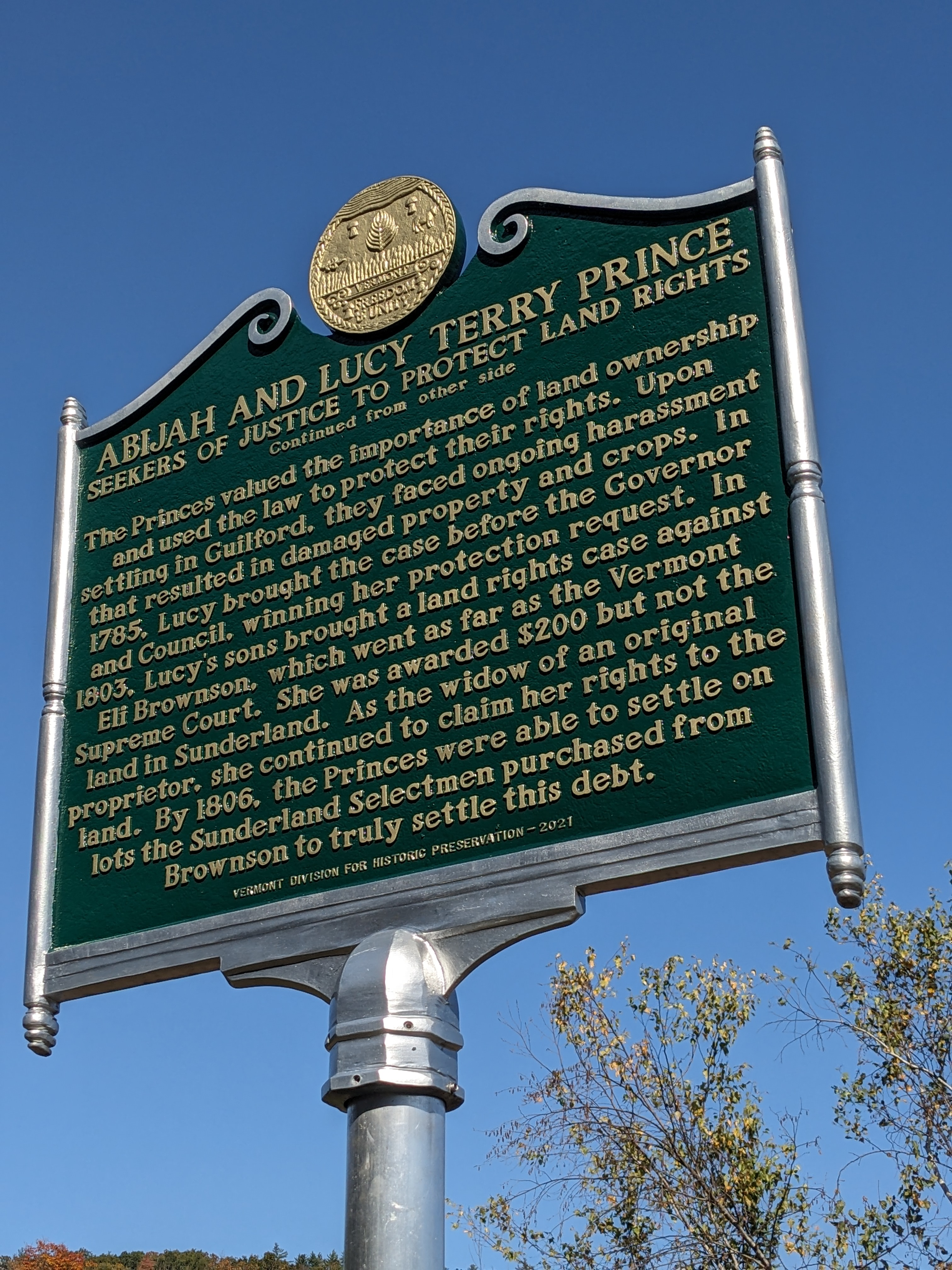
- Born: c. 1733; Africa
- Died: 1821 (aged 87–88); Sunderland, Vermont
- Spouse: Abijah Prince (m. 1756; died 1794)
- Children: 6

Lucy Terry Prince, often credited as simply Lucy Terry (c. 1733–1821), was an American settler and poet. Kidnapped in Africa and enslaved, she was taken to the British colony of Rhode Island. Her future husband purchased her freedom before their marriage in 1756. She composed a ballad poem, "Bars Fight", about a 1746 incident in which two white families were attacked by Native Americans. It was preserved orally until it was published in 1854 by J. G. Holland in the newspaper he edited, The Springfield Daily Republican. It is considered the oldest known work of literature by an African American.

== Early life ==
Terry was born in c. 1733 on the African continent. She was abducted from there and sold into slavery in Rhode Island as an infant in about 1733. She lived in Rhode Island until the age of five, when she was sold to Ebenezer Wells of Deerfield, Massachusetts, who allowed the five-year-old Terry to be baptized into the Christian faith during the Great Awakening.

In 1756, Lucy married Abijah Prince, a successful free Black man from Curaçao, who had purchased her freedom. They were married by justice of the peace Elijah Williams, brother of Ephraim Williams, an officer from Massachusetts Bay who famously died in the French and Indian War the previous year. In 1764, the Princes settled in Guilford, Vermont, where all six children were born. They were Tatnai, Cesar, Drucilla, Durexa, Abijah Jr., and Festus. Cesar fought in the American Revolutionary War.

== Poetry ==
Terry was famous in her own time for her "rhymes and stories". However, only a single letter in Abijah's handwriting and none in Lucy's has survived. Shopkeeper's records show that their household sometimes purchased paper, so it is presumed that Terry wrote other literary works, which were eventually lost during the attacks on her household and declining fortune. Only fragments of her work were printed in her lifetime, and a single poem decades later.

=== Bars Fight ===
Terry's work "Bars Fight", composed in 1746, is a ballad about an attack upon two white families by Native Americans on August 25, 1746. This poem is part of the American captivity narrative genre. The attack occurred in an area of Deerfield called "The Bars", which was a colonial term for a meadow. The poem was preserved orally until 1854, when it was published in The Springfield Daily Republican as an excerpt from Josiah Gilbert Holland's then soon-to-be-released History of Western Massachusetts (1855). Holland referred to her as "Luce Bijah", taking part of her husband's first name as her surname.

Terry's work is considered the oldest known work of literature by an African American, though Phillis Wheatley's Poems on Various Subjects, Religious and Moral, printed in 1773, was the first published work by an African American.

=== Fightiad ===
In 2024, a fragment of a manuscript poem by Lucy, apparently entitled "Fightiad," was located in an 1818 issue of Hampshire Gazette and Public Advertiser:

Colonel Ephraim he,
An Indian see;
Was kill'd and died immediately:
He was kill'd outright,
And died immediately,
Before he had time to fight.

While the fragment seems to have been reproduced to mock its irregularity, and may be drawn from a discarded draft, it still offers valuable information. The topic is a eulogy for Ephraim Williams, the famous casualty of the French and Indian War whose brother officiated Lucy's wedding. Seemingly written in imitation of Scottish doggerel, it was printed alongside a variant couplet from "Bars Fight" with notably different meter. The anonymous scribe, who may be identified with the pseudonym "Quatre" used in other contributions to the paper, states that "the fragments of this poem, that have been rescued from destruction, are in the hands of a learned friend with a view to publication;" this may be understood as referring to Quatre himself.

The chronology of "Fightiad" and "Bars Fight" is puzzling, as it seems this fragment from "Fightiad," dating no earlier than 1755, was reworked into a later version of "Bars Fight" with more regular meter. Scholar Walker Mimms suggests that the present state of "Bars Fight" might be edited by others working in material from "Fightiad" rather than Lucy herself.

== Farm sabotage and oral arguments ==
Lucy Terry Prince and Abijah Prince became prominent and prosperous smallholders in Guilford, Vermont, but were eventually ruined by a dispute started by their neighbor John Noyes, a Connecticut man from a slaveholding family, who referred to Lucy's husband as "Abijah Negro". Noyes and various men he had hired damaged the Princes' farm and filed frivolous lawsuits against them. The Princes won every lawsuit but failed to end the feud. After a particularly fateful incident, the Princes retained the services of Samuel Knight, a prominent jurist of the era. In 1785, Lucy successfully pled her case before the Governor of Vermont, who found that she had been "much injured" by the Noyes who were "greatly oppressing" her and her husband. Soon afterward, a mob assembled by Noyes invaded the Princes' farm in the middle of the night, beat a black farmhand nearly to death, burned crops, and left the household in ruins. The state of Vermont prosecuted the mob and sentenced them to prison. Noyes bailed out his henchmen, was not himself prosecuted, and served as a state legislator in Vermont for over a decade.

In 1803, Lucy, now destitute, returned to the Vermont Supreme Court to argue on behalf of her sons against false land claims made against them by Colonel Eli Brownson. She was awarded a sum of $200. She was the first woman to argue before the high court, holding her own against two of the leading lawyers in the state, one of whom later became Chief Justice.

In 1806, after months of petitioning, Lucy convinced the town selectmen of Sunderland, Vermont to purchase an additional $200 (~$4,117 in 2025) of land from Brownson for her use, to provide for her family.

Lucy reportedly delivered a three-hour address to the board of trustees of Williams College while trying to gain admittance for her son Festus. She was unsuccessful, and Festus was reportedly denied entry on account of the school's racist admission policies. This oral history was recorded at the time of Lucy's death by a resident, who also reported that Lucy remained popular in her hometown until her old age and that young boys would often come to her home to hear her talk.

== Death ==
Prince's husband died in 1794. By 1803, Prince had moved to nearby Sunderland. She rode on horseback annually to visit her husband's grave until she died in 1821.

The following obituary was published for Prince on Tuesday, August 21, 1821, in the Greenfield, Massachusetts, paper The Frankylin Herald:

At Sunderland, Vt., July 11th, Mrs. Lucy Prince, a woman of colour. From the church and town records where she formerly resided, we learn that she was brought from Bristol, Rhode Island, to Deerfield, Mass. when she was four years old, by Mr. Ebenezer Wells: that she was 97 years of age—that she was early devoted to God in Baptism: that she united with the church in Deerfield in 1744—Was married to Abijah Prince, May 17th, 1756, by Elijah Williams, Esq. and that she had been the mother of six children. In this remarkable woman there was an assemblage of qualities rarely to be found among her sex. Her volubility was exceeded by none, and in general, the fluency of her speech was not destitute of instruction and education. She was much respected among her acquaintances, who treated her with deference.

The Prince family was remembered in Guilford for many decades after their death. John Noyes' daughter was once startled off a horse by the sight of their ghosts, and ghost sightings on their farm have been reported even into the 21st century.
