= Al McWilliams =

American cartoonist (1916–1993)

- Born: Alden Spurr McWilliams; February 2, 1916 New York City
- Died: March 19, 1993 (aged 77)
- Areas: Penciller, Inker, Letterer
- Notable works: Danny Raven in Dateline: Danger!: First African-American lead character of a comic strip
- Awards: National Cartoonists Society's 1978 award for Comic Book: Story

Alden Spurr McWilliams generally credited as Al McWilliams and A. McWilliams (February 2, 1916 – March 19, 1993), was an American comics artist who co-created the first African-American lead character of a comic strip. He won the National Cartoonists Society's 1978 award for Comic Book: Story.

== Early life and career ==
McWillams was born in New York City, the son of chauffeur John and piano teacher Florence L. McWilliams. His sister Faith was born in 1921. By 1929, the family, of Irish ancestry, had moved to Greenwich, Connecticut, where John McWilliams became a radio-company chemist's laboratory assistant. Al McWilliams graduated from Greenwich High School in 1934, and that September began attending the New York School of Fine and Applied Arts, which later became the Parsons School of Design.

Circa 1935, he worked as an art assistant on Lyman Young's newspaper comic strip Tim Tyler's Luck. In 1938, he began illustrating for such pulp magazines as Clues Detective Stories and Flying Aces, where for three years he wrote and drew biographies of famed flyers in a single-page comic strip, They Had What It Takes.

He entered comic books as the fledgling medium began, with his earliest confirmed credit the four-page feature "Capt. Frank Hawks — Air Ace" in Dell Comics' Crackajack Funnies #7 (cover-dated Dec. 1938). Other early credits, all for Dell, include the feature "Crime Busters" a.k.a. "The Crime Busters with Al Brady", in The Funnies; "Speed Bolton: Air Ace" and "Stratosphere Jim” a.k.a. "Stratosphere Jim and his Flying Fortress" in Crackajack Funnies; and the radio-show spinoff "Gang Busters" in Popular Comics and Four Color.

He enlisted in the U.S. Army on October 1, 1942, fighting in such World War II battles as D-Day, for which he was awarded the Bronze Star and France's Croix de Guerre. Either having stockpiled stories prior or finding time during his service, he both wrote and drew the Quality Comics war-comics features "Spitfire" in Crack Comics and "Atlantic Patrol", "Pacific Patrol", and "Secret War News" in Military Comics, as well as simply drawing other features. He was discharged in 1945, and upon returning to the US in 1946 began drawing the detective feature "Steve Wood" in Quality's National Comics. Through the remainder of the decade, he also drew comics for companies including D.S. Publishing, Novelty Press, Hillman Periodicals, and Star Publications, with at least one romance comics story for Archie Comics, and did interior art and covers, variously, for such pulps as the Westerns All Western Magazine, Exciting Western, Rodeo Romances, Texas Rangers and Zane Grey's Western Magazine, the science-fiction Planet Stories, the sports-oriented Fight Stories, and the aviation-adventure Wings.

== Later career ==
From 1950 to 1952, McWilliams primarily drew romance comics and crime comics for Lev Gleason Publications. Then in 1952, he and writer Oskar Lebeck created the science-fiction comic strip "Twin Earths", which ran through 1963. From 1961 to 1968, he drew the sea-adventure strip Davy Jones, a spinoff of Sam Leff's Curley Kayoe.

Original black-and-white art, signed "A. McWilliams" and inscribed "Al McWilliams", for the Dateline: Danger! color comic strip of Sunday, March 16, 1969. The series' co-star, Danny Raven, was the first African-American lead character of a comic strip.

McWilliams and writer John Saunders' Dateline: Danger!, which ran from 1968 to 1974, introduced the first African-American lead character of a comic strip, Danny Raven, co-star of this adventure series about two intelligence agents working undercover as reporters.

Other comic-strip work includes the Star Trek and Buck Rogers strips. He worked as an assistant on John Prentice's Rip Kirby in 1964 and 1965; on Don Sherwood's U.S. Marine strip Dan Flagg from 1965 to 1967; and on Leonard Starr's On Stage in 1969 and 1970, and Al Williamson's Secret Agent Corrigan in 1975. McWilliams also illustrated for advertising.

He drew no confirmed comic-book stories from 1952 through 1965, when he illustrated two tales in Warren Publishing's black-and-white horror comics magazine Creepy. He went on to draw stories in the supernatural/mystery anthology comics Boris Karloff Tales of Mystery and The Twilight Zone, two TV-series spinoffs published by Western Publishing's Gold Key Comics, along with a smattering of other stories for that imprint — including some issues of the superhero series Doctor Solar, Man of the Atom — as well as for Warren and Tower Comics.

McWilliams illustrated the first graphic novel version of Dracula, based very closely on Bram Stoker's book, for Russ Jones Productions. It was published initially as an Ace Books paperback in 1966, and most recently has had a deluxe larger-size reprinting as a Vanguard Productions hardcover in 2021.

Concentrating on Dateline: Danger!, he drew no comic books from 1968 to 1974. That year he did three supernatural stories for Red Circle Sorcery and Mad House, from Archie Comics' Red Circle Comics imprint, along with a handful of stories for Atlas/Seaboard Comics. He inked roughly a half-dozen Marvel Comics stories in 1975 and illustrated the first issue of DC Comics's Justice Inc. before returning to Gold Key, where he drew and lettered stories through 1982. His work there included issues of Flash Gordon and the TV-spinoff comic Buck Rogers in the 25th Century.

His last known comics work is penciling and inking two short stories published in the May 1984 issues of two comics in Archie's Archie Adventure Series imprint, Blue Ribbon Comics #8 and Steel Sterling #6.

== Personal life ==
McWilliams married Ruth Jensen in 1946, and the couple moved to Darien, Connecticut, where they raised sons Chris Jensen McWilliams and Alden Richards McWilliams. The couple, who also had a home in Eastham, Massachusetts, was married 46 years at the time of McWilliams' death from respiratory failure at a hospital in Stamford, Connecticut.

== Awards ==
In 1979 McWilliams won the National Cartoonists Society's 1978 award for Comic Book: Story.
