= Bars Fight =

American ballad poem by Lucy Terry

- by Lucy Terry
- Publisher: The Springfield Daily Republican
- Publication date: November 20, 1854 (170 years ago)

"Bars Fight" is a ballad poem written by Lucy Terry about an attack upon two white families by Native Americans on August 21, 1746. The incident occurred in an area of Deerfield, Massachusetts, called "The Bars," which was a colonial term for a meadow. The poem was preserved orally and not published until the November 20, 1854, issue of The Springfield Daily Republican, as an excerpt from the book History of Western Massachusetts published the following year (1855) by Republican associate editor Josiah Gilbert Holland.

"Bars Fight" is believed to be the oldest known work of literature by an African American and is the only known work by Lucy Terry.

"Bars Fight" as published in The Springfield Daily Republican, November 20, 1854

== Text of the ballad ==
The text of the ballad from Holland's History of Western Massachusetts, 1855:

August 'twas the twenty-fifth,
Seventeen hundred forty-six;
The Indians did in ambush lay,
Some very valient men to slay,
The names of whom I'll not leave out.
Samuel Allen like a hero fout,
And though he was so brave and bold,
His face no more shall we behold.
Eleazer Hawks was killed outright,
Before he had time to fight,—
Before he did the Indians see,
Was shot and killed immediately.
Oliver Amsden he was slain,
Which caused his friends much grief and pain.
Simeon Amsden they found dead,
Not many rods distant from his head.
Adonijah Gillett we do hear
Did lose his life which was so dear.
John Sadler fled across the water,
And thus escaped the dreadful slaughter.
Eunice Allen see the Indians coming,
And hopes to save herself by running,
And had not her petticoats stopped her,
The awful creatures had not catched her,
Nor tommy hawked her on her head,
And left her on the ground for dead.
Young Samuel Allen, Oh lack-a-day!
Was taken and carried to Canada.

After the word "slay", an alternate oral transmission of the poem offers an accurate location and body count: "Twas nigh unto Sam Dickson's mill / The Indians there five men did kill."

== Rediscovery ==
After its 1855 publication, the poem was undiscovered until 1942, when it was published in Lorenzo Greene's The Negro in Colonial New England, 1620–1776. This youthful occasional poem is the only surviving work by Terry, who was said to have been a prolific poet. The likelihood is corroborated by Prince’s receipts for writing paper purchased in the 1750s, making it "impossible to believe that she didn’t write other poems.” In 2024, Walker Mimms identified two newly surfaced excerpts from the 8 December 1818 issue of the Hampshire Gazette and Public Advertiser that shed significant new light on the circumstances of Prince’s composition, arguing "that Prince was published long before Holland’s book, indeed in her own lifetime.".

Prior scholarship has instead drawn attention to how Terry evokes her participation in the local community by recounting the names of the men and women who fought alongside her, and how the town responded by preserving the poem and her name in their oral histories.
