= Screentone =

Technique for applying textures and shades to drawings

Three shapes overlaid with different screentone patterns

Screentone is a technique for applying textures and shades to drawings, used as an alternative to hatching. In the conventional process, patterns are transferred to paper from preprinted sheets. It is also known by the common brand names Zip-A-Tone (1937, now defunct), Chart-Pak (1949), and Letratone (1966, from Letraset).

A dry transfer screentone sheet, sometimes informally known as a "tone", consists of a flexible transparent backing, the printed texture, and a wax adhesive layer. The sheet is applied to the paper, adhesive down, and rubbed with a stylus (also called a burnishing tool) on the backing side. The backing is then peeled off, leaving the ink adhered to the paper where pressure was applied.

== See also ==
- Ben Day dots
- Dithering
- Grayscale
- Halftone
- Hatching, the representation of color by patterns of lines.
- Stippling
