= Dateline: Danger! =

American comic strip

- Author(s): John Saunders (writer); Al McWilliams (artist)
- Current status/schedule: Concluded
- Launch date: November 11, 1968
- End date: March 17, 1974
- Syndicate(s): Publishers-Hall Syndicate
- Genre(s): adventure, espionage

Dateline: Danger! is an American syndicated newspaper comic strip published from November 11, 1968 to March 17, 1974, created and produced by writer John Saunders and artist Al McWilliams. The series, about two intelligence agents working undercover as reporters, co-starred the character Danny Raven, the first African-American lead character of a mainstream comic strip.

== Publication history ==
Inspired by the television series I Spy, the first TV dramatic show to co-star an African-American in a lead role, writer John Saunders and artist Al McWilliams created the adventure comic strip Dateline: Danger! for the Publishers-Hall Syndicate. Introduced as both a daily and a color Sunday strip in November 1968, it similarly was the first in this medium with an African-American lead character, Danny Raven. As in the TV show, the two protagonists were American secret agents who globetrotted to trouble spots under the cover of another profession.

Comics historian Maurice Horn wrote,

The 1960s were the decade during which the comics syndicates were most blatantly aping successful television shows in a desperate (and vain) attempt at regaining their fast-disappearing readership. One of the most noteworthy entries in the crowded field was Dateline: Danger!, a strip based on the popular I Spy program starring Robert Culp and Bill Cosby. ... There was much banter and wisecracking going between the partners as they raced cars, engaged in fisticuffs, and dodged bullets in the course of their everyday activities.

The comic strip ran through 1974.

A consultant on the strip was Saunders' father, Allen Saunders, writer of the comic strips Steve Roper and Mike Nomad, Mary Worth and Kerry Drake.

== Characters and story ==
Original black-and-white art for the Dateline" Danger! color comic strip of Sunday, March 16, 1969. The series' co-star, Danny Raven, was the first African-American lead character of a comic strip.

African-American Danny Raven and his Caucasian partner Troy — an acronym nickname for Theodore Randolph Oscar Young — worked for the agency US Intelligence, which planted them undercover as reporters for a news organization. When the two were not working to stop revolutionary plots in South America, the destabilization of democratic African nations or Cold War tyranny in Eastern Europe, Raven might find himself helping his sister Wendy and younger brother Lee Roy confront hatemonger Robin Jackson, who aimed to instigate race riots through his militant newspaper, The Revolt.
