= Morrie Turner =

American cartoonist

- Turner in 2005
- Born: Morris Nolton Turner; December 11, 1923 Oakland, California
- Died: January 25, 2014 (aged 90) Sacramento, California
- Area: Cartoonist
- Notable works: Wee Pals
- Awards: full list

Morris Nolton Turner (December 11, 1923 – January 25, 2014) was an American cartoonist. He was creator of the strip Wee Pals, the first American syndicated strip with a racially integrated cast of characters.

== Biography ==
Turner was raised in Oakland, California, the youngest child of a Pullman porter father and a homemaker and nurse mother. He attended Cole Elementary School and McClymonds High School in Oakland and Berkeley High School.

Turner first started drawing at age 10, drawing what he heard while listening to radio shows. He later moved onto cartoons during high school, ultimately deciding at the age of 14 that he wanted to become a professional cartoonist. During this time, he also worked on the school newspaper, and was elected to the student council, though widespread racism greatly hindered any benefits he gained as a result. Turner got his first training in cartooning via a correspondence course. During World War II, where he served as a mechanic with Tuskegee Airmen, his illustrations appeared in the newspaper Stars and Stripes. After the war, while working for the Oakland Police Department, he created the comic strip Baker's Helper.

In 1963, Turner joined the Association of California Cartoonists and Gag Artists, where he befriended fellow cartoonists Charles M. Schulz and Bil Keane, the respective creators of Peanuts and Family Circus. Desiring to contribute to the ongoing Civil Rights Movement, he was encouraged by activists to create work based on his own experiences as a black man.

This thought of a comic based on the experience of a minority would be further solidified during a discussion with Schulz. Turner lamented the lack of minorities in cartoons, and Schulz suggested he create one. Morris' first attempt, Dinky Fellas, featured an all-black cast, but found publication in only one newspaper, the Chicago Defender, where it debuted on July 25, 1964. Turner would later rework the strip and retire the Dinky Fellas name in 1965. The comic was retooled into Wee Pals, and upon its debut, it became the first American syndicated comic strip to have a cast of diverse ethnicity. Although the strip was only originally carried by five newspapers, it was picked-up by more than 100 after the assassination of Martin Luther King Jr. in April 1968.

In 1969, Morris and his wife, Letha, collaborated to add a new segment to accompany Wee Pals. Titled "Soul Corner", the segment highlighted famous ethnic minorities, with Morris illustrating, and Letha researching the subjects.

In 1970, Turner became a co-chairman of the White House Conference on Children and Youth.

Turner appeared twice as a guest on Mister Rogers' Neighborhood, on May 7, 1971 and May 14, 1973. In his 1971 visit, Turner discussed his comic strip and how each of his characters were named, as he drew examples of his characters. On his return 1973 visit, he showed Fred Rogers pictures he had drawn of several of the neighbors in Fred's television neighborhood. Turner also presented a clip from his Kid Power animated series, which aired Saturday mornings on ABC at the time. As well, during the 1972–73 television season, Wee Pals on the Go was aired by ABC's owned-and-operated station in San Francisco, KGO-TV. This Sunday morning show featured child actors who portrayed the main characters of Turner's comic strip: Nipper, Randy, Sybil, Connie and Oliver. With and through the kids, Turner explored venues, activities and objects.

As the comic strip continued, Turner added characters of more ethnicities, as well as child with physical disabilities.

During the Vietnam War, Turner, Keane, and four other members of the National Cartoonist Society traveled to South Vietnam, where they spent a month drawing more than 3,000 caricatures of service personnel.

For concerts by the Bay Area Little Symphony of Oakland, California, Turner drew pictures to the music and of children in the audience.

Turner launched the first in a series of Summer Art exhibitions at the East Oakland Youth Development Center (EOYDC) on June 10, 1995.

== Personal life ==
Turner married Letha Mae Harvey on April 6, 1946; they collaborated on "Soul Corner," the weekly supplement to Wee Pals. Morrie and Letha had one son, Morrie Jr; Letha died in 1994. Late in life, Turner's companion was Karol Trachtenburg of Sacramento. Turner died on January 25, 2014, at age 90 from chronic kidney disease in a hospital in Sacramento.

== Tributes ==
In 1967, Keane created the Family Circus character Morrie, a playmate of Billy and the only recurring black character in the strip, based on Turner.

== Awards ==
In 2003, the National Cartoonists Society recognized Turner for his work on Wee Pals and others with the Milton Caniff Lifetime Achievement Award.

Throughout his career, Turner was showered with awards and community distinctions. For example, he received the Brotherhood Award from the National Conference of Christians and Jews and the Inter-Group Relations Award from the Anti-Defamation League of Bnai Brith. In 1971, he received the Alameda County (California) Education Association Layman's Annual Award.

In 2000, the Cartoon Art Museum presented Turner with the Sparky Award, named in honor of Charles Schulz.

Turner was honored a number of times at San Diego Comic-Con: in 1981, he was given an Inkpot Award; and in 2012 he was given the Bob Clampett Humanitarian Award.

== Bibliography ==
=== Wee Pals collections ===
- Wee Pals That "Kid Power" Gang in Rainbow Power (Signet Books, 1968)
- Wee Pals (Signet Books, 1969) — introduction by Charles M. Schulz
- Kid Power (Signet Books, 1970)
- Nipper (Westminster Press, 1971)
- Nipper's Secret Power (Westminster Press, 1971) ISBN 978-0-664-32498-8
- Wee Pals: Rainbow Power (Signet Books, 1973)
- Wee Pals: Doing Their Thing (Signet Books, 1973)
- Wee Pals' Nipper and Nipper's Secret Power (Signet Books, 1974)
- Wee Pals: Book of Knowledge (Signet Books, 1974) ISBN 0451058003
- Wee Pals: Staying Cool (Signet Books, 1974) ISBN 0451060768
- Wee Pals: Funky Tales (New American Library, 1975)
- Wee Pals: Welcome to the Club (Rainbow Power Club Books, 1978)
- Choosing a Health Career: Featuring Wee Pals, the Kid Power Gang (Dept. of Health, Education, and Welfare, Public Health Service, Health Resources Administration, 1979)
- Wee Pals: A Full-Length Musical Comedy for Children or Young Teenagers (The Dramatic Publishing Company, 1981)
- Wee Pals Make Friends with Music and Musical Instruments: Coloring Book (Stockton Symphony Association, 1982)
- Wee Pals, the Kid Power Gang: Thinking Well (Ingham County Health Department, 1983)
- Wee Pals Doing the Right Thing Coloring Book (Oakland Police Department, 1991)
- Explore Black History with Wee Pals (Just Us Books, 1998) ISBN 0940975793
- The Kid Power Gang Salutes African-Americans in the Military Past and Present (Conway B. Jones Jr., 2000)

=== Willis and his Friends ===
- Ser un Hombre (Lear Siegler/Fearon Publishers, 1972) ISBN 0822474271
- Prejudice (Fearon, 1972) ASIN B00071EIOG
- The Vandals (Fearon, 1974) ASIN B0006WJ9JU

=== Other books ===
- A Funny Thing Happened on the Way to Freedom (Ross Simmons, 1967)
- Black and White Coloring Book (Troubadour Press, 1969) — written with Letha Turner
- Right On (Signet Books, 1969)
- Getting It All Together (Signet Books, 1972)
- Where's Herbie? A Sickle Cell Anemia Story and Coloring Book (Sickle Cell Anemia Workshop, 1972)
- Famous Black Americans (Judson Press, 1973) ISBN 0817005919
- Happy Birthday America (Signet Book, 1975)
- All God's Chillun Got Soul (Judson Press, 1980) ISBN 0817008926
- Thinking Well (Wisconsin Clearing House, 1983)
- Black History Trivia: Quiz and Game Book (News America Syndicate, 1986)
- What About Gangs? Just Say No! (Oakland Police Department, 1994)
- Babcock (Scholastic, 1996) — by John Cottonwood and Morrie Turner, ISBN 059022221X
- Mom Come Quick (Wright Pub Co., 1997) — by Joy Crawford and Morrie Turner, ISBN 0965236838
- Super Sistahs: Featuring the Accomplishments of African-American Women Past and Present (Bye Publishing Services, 2005), ISBN 0965673952
