= Wee Pals =

American comic strip by Morrie Turner

- Author: Morrie Turner
- Website: www.creators.com/comics/wee-pals.html
- Current status/schedule: Concluded daily & Sunday strip; in reruns
- Launch date: February 15, 1965
- Syndicate(s): Lew Little Enterprises, then the Register and Tribune Syndicate, then King Features Syndicate, then United Feature Syndicate, then Cowles Syndicate, then Creators Syndicate
- Genre(s): Humor, Children, Teens, Adults

Wee Pals is an American syndicated comic strip about a diverse group of children, created and produced by Morrie Turner. It was the first comic strip syndicated in the United States to have a cast of diverse ethnicity, dubbed the "Rainbow Gang".

== Background ==
When cartoonist Morrie Turner began questioning why there were no minorities in the comic strips, his mentor, Peanuts cartoonist Charles M. Schulz, suggested he create one. Morris' first attempt, Dinky Fellas, featured an all-black cast, but found publication in only one newspaper, the Chicago Defender. Turner integrated the strip, renaming it Wee Pals, and on February 15, 1965, it became the first American syndicated comic strip to have a cast of diverse ethnicity.

Initially syndicated by Lew Little Enterprises, it was then carried by the Register and Tribune Syndicate, before moving to United Feature Syndicate in the 1970s. When it debuted, the strip originally appeared in only five daily newspapers, as many papers refused to run a strip featuring black characters. After the assassination of Martin Luther King Jr., the number of papers carrying the strip grew either to 60 or to more than 100 dailies (sources differ).

As the comic strip's popularity grew, Turner added characters. He included children of more and more ethnicities, as well as a child with a physical disability. He also added a weekly strip called "Soul Circle", which profiled notable African Americans from history and current events on Saturdays, and similarly devoted a panel on the Sunday strips called "Soul Corner."

In its later years, the strip was distributed by Creators Syndicate. It ended with Turner's death in 2014.

== Characters ==
- Nipper — An African-American boy who always wears a blue or grey American Civil War kepi, and has a dog named General Lee. Turner based Nipper on himself as a child.
- Ralph — A white neighborhood bigot and ruffian.
- Connie — An athletic white girl who frequently clashes with Ralph over his misogyny and racism, despite that she herself expresses chauvanistic and misandrist views. She's an outspoken member of the neighborhood "Girls' Lib" organization (a play on the Women's Liberation Movement).
- Sybil — African-American girl who is also in the Girls' Lib organization. She is a very nice and respectful young girl who has a very good relationship with Connie.
- Oliver — A chubby, bookish white boy with glasses.
- Diz — An African-American boy who's never without his sunglasses and beret. He plays trumpet like his namesake Dizzy Gillespie and often narrates the "Funky Fables" strips.
- Charlotte — A white bespectacled girl who uses a wheelchair. She has a pet parrot named Polly Esther.
- Randy — (African-American) The second in command of the Rainbow Club who is very good friends with Oliver. He also has a one-sided friendship with Ralph.
- Pablo — (Chicano/Mexican-American) A happy carefree young boy who is very good friends with Randy and Jerry. He is often shown to be the pacifist of the group.
- Mikki — (African-American; about four years old) A young girl who has a very big imagination. She is mainly seen with Jerry and Trinh.
- Rocky — (Native American) A respectful kind young boy who is very proud of his racial background. He is good friends with Randy and Nipper.
- George — (Asian-American of Chinese origin) A quiet young boy with a vivid imagination who often discusses Chinese parables. He has a good relationship with Oliver, Nipper, and Jerry.
- Jerry — (Jewish) An upbeat, happy, loyal young man with a very big heart. He is very good friends with Nipper, Oliver, Diz, Randy and Trinh. It's shown that he might have feelings for Sybil.
- Trinh — (Vietnamese) A kind-hearted little boy who is very good friends with Mikki.
- Sally — (ethnicity unstated, but deaf-mute) A respectful young girl with a very kind heart. She appears in the later strips in the series.
- Wellington — (ethnicity unstated, dark hair covering eyes) A hip young boy who is mainly shown with Diz. It is shown in an earlier strip that he wears glasses underneath his bangs.

== Wee Pals bibliography ==
- Wee Pals That "Kid Power" Gang in Rainbow Power (Signet Books, 1968)
- Wee Pals (Signet Books, 1969) introduction by Charles M. Schulz
- Kid Power (Signet Books, 1970)
- Nipper (Westminster Press, 1971)
- Nipper's Secret Power (Westminster Press, 1971) ISBN 0-664-32498-3
- Wee Pals: Rainbow Power (Signet Books, 1973)
- Wee Pals: Doing Their Thing (Signet Books, 1973)
- Wee Pals' Nipper and Nipper's Secret Power (Signet Books, 1974)
- Wee Pals: Book of Knowledge (Signet Books, 1974) ISBN 0451058003
- Wee Pals: Staying Cool (Signet Books, 1974) ISBN 0451060768
- Wee Pals: Funky Tales (New American Library, 1975)
- Wee Pals: Welcome to the Club (Rainbow Power Club Books, 1978)
- Choosing a Health Career: Featuring Wee Pals, the Kid Power Gang (Dept. of Health, Education, and Welfare, Public Health Service, Health Resources Administration, 1979)
- Wee Pals: A Full-Length Musical Comedy for Children or Young Teenagers (The Dramatic Publishing Company, 1981)
- Wee Pals Make Friends with Music and Musical Instruments: Coloring Book (Stockton Symphony Association, 1982)
- Wee Pals, the Kid Power Gang: Thinking Well (Ingham County Health Department, 1983)
- Wee Pals Doing the Right Thing Coloring Book (Oakland Police Department, 1991)
- Explore Black History with Wee Pals (Just Us Books, 1998) ISBN 0940975793
- The Kid Power Gang Salutes African-Americans in the Military Past and Present (Conway B. Jones Jr., 2000)

== Animated series: Kid Power ==
During the 1972–73 television season, Wee Pals was animated as Kid Power, a series produced by Rankin/Bass with animation done in Japan at Topcraft Limited Company. It aired in the United States on ABC television on Saturday mornings.

All of Turner's characters were featured, united through the coalition the characters dubbed "Rainbow Power". In The Encyclopedia of American Animated Television Shows, David Perlutter says, "The same broad ethnic mix [as the comic], making it one of the first television animation programs aimed at children to accurately reflect the racial diversity of America and thus providing for many others to follow."

A total of 17 episodes were made, most of which aired from September 16, 1972, to January 6, 1973, followed by reruns. In the following year, a few new episodes that were unfinished during the first season aired on Sunday mornings (combined with reruns) until September 1, 1974.

=== Staff ===
- Producer/director: Arthur Rankin Jr., Jules Bass
- Teleplay: William J. Keenan
- Associate Producer: Basil Cox
- Animation Supervision: Toru Hara, Tsuguyuki Kubo
- Music: Perry Botkin Jr.
- Songs: Jules Bass, Perry Botkin Jr.
- Editorial Supervision: Irwin Goldress
- Sound Engineers: Jim Harris, John Boyd

=== Voices ===
- Donald Fullilove (Diz and Randy)
- Michelle Johnson (Sybil)
- Charles Kennedy (Nipper)
- Gary Shapiro (Jerry and Wellington)
- Jay Silverheels Jr. (Rocky)
- Greg Thomas (Oliver)
- Jeff Thomas (Ralph)
- April Winchell (Connie)
- Carey Wong (George)

== Wee Pals on the Go ==
During the same 1972–73 television season, Wee Pals on the Go was aired by KGO-TV, the ABC owned-and-operated station in the San Francisco Bay Area. This live-action Sunday morning show featured child actors who portrayed the main characters of Turner's comic strip, Nipper, Randy, Sybil, Connie, and Oliver.

== Musical ==
In 1981, Turner collaborated with writer Ole Kittleson and musician Norman Boaz on a musical version of the strip, also called Wee Pals, described as "A Full-Length Play for Ten Boys, Four Girls, Fourteen Women, and One Dog (real or child in costume)," intended to be performed for school plays and children's theater productions. Original songs written for the show included "Wee Pals," "Mister Cool," and "Soul Food."

== See also ==
- Luther
