= Mister Rogers' Neighborhood season 9 =

Mister Rogers' Neighborhood
- Season 9
- No. of episodes: 10

Release
- Original network: PBS

Season chronology
- ← Previous; Season 8 Next → Season 10

The following is a list of episodes from the ninth season of the PBS series, Mister Rogers' Neighborhood, which aired from 1976 to 1979. The first broadcast of Mister Rogers' Neighborhood was on the National Educational Television network on February 19, 1968.

== Episode 1 (Remembering) ==
Rogers takes viewers to his garage, which is filled with all of the show's puppets, scripts, videotapes, and other memorabilia. He and Mr. McFeely watch a videotape of episode 32 from season 2. In the Neighborhood of Make-Believe, X reminds Lady Aberlin how to prepare the crystal ball for gazing into the future.

- Aired on February 16, 1976.

== Episode 2 (Remembering) ==
Rogers brings all the Neighborhood of Make-Believe models to the garage, where he and Betty Aberlin watch a videotape of episode 13 (The Royal Wedding) also from the season 2. In the Neighborhood of Make-Believe, Lady Elaine has painted the crystal ball to try to cut down the time needed to look into one's future. But the paint causes no end of problems.

- Aired on February 17, 1976.

== Episode 3 (Remembering) ==
Joe Negri goes to Rogers' garage to tape actress Mari Gardner performing nursery rhymes. The Neighborhood of Make-Believe calls out for Princess Margaret H. Witch to remove the paint from the crystal ball.

Mr. Rogers sings "Tomorrow" before "It's Such A Good Feeling" at the end of the show.

- Aired on February 18, 1976.

== Episode 4 (Remembering) ==
Mister Rogers returns to his garage to replay one of Chef Brockett's early appearances in the television house. Margaret H. Witch returns to help clean up the disabled crystal ball. But she can't do it without Lady Elaine, who had painted one side of the crystal ball red and the other half blue. When Lady Elaine confesses, she plays the last part in getting the crystal ball back to normal.

This was the last time Mr. Rogers plays "Tomorrow" before he signs off with "It's Such A Good Feeling"

- Aired on February 19, 1976.

== Episode 5 (Remembering) ==
After replacing a light bulb in the traffic light in the television house, Rogers looks back at the tape of episode 4 (The NOM Models) from season 3 and his visit to Officer Clemmons' police station. He and François Clemmons discuss some of the operas in which Clemmons performed. Lady Aberlin sees what the future holds for Daniel and X.

- Aired on February 20, 1976.
- This season only consisted of five episodes. This was because it was set up to prepare the viewers for a large mass of reruns, dating back as far as episode #1001 from 1969. Throughout the week of Season 9, Episodes #1456-1460, which aired from February 16–20, 1976, Mister Rogers would play back tapes of past episodes. After February 20, 1976, the series went on a three-year hiatus, and new episodes resumed once again on August 20, 1979.

== Let's Talk About Going to the Hospital (1976) ==
A primetime special. Mister Rogers explains going to the hospital.

- Aired on September 6, 1976.

== Let's Talk About Having an Operation (1976) ==
A primetime special. Mister Rogers explains the process of surgery to his young viewers.

- Aired on September 13, 1976.

== Let's Talk About Wearing a Cast (1976) ==
A primetime special. Mister Rogers describes what getting a cast means. His guest is Dr. Mary Williams Clark, a pediatric orthopedic surgeon.

- Aired on September 20, 1976.

== Christmastime with Mister Rogers (1977) ==
A primetime special. This rarely televised special shows Rogers at his neighborly best, extending holiday wishes and attending a children's dance. Lady Elaine Fairchilde has a touch of Dickens in the invaluable lesson she is taught.

- This was the only episode to premiere in 1977; Aired on December 20, 1977.
- This episode was broadcast every Christmas until 1982.
- The opening and closing sequences of this special had Rogers walking through a real neighborhood, instead of the usual sequences with the model neighborhood.

== Springtime with Mister Rogers (1979) ==
A primetime special. Betty's Little Theater springs a leak in its roof. To raise money to fix it, everyone in the neighborhood stages a performance. Lady Elaine fantasizes about being a princess.

- Aired on June 3, 1979.
