= Mister Rogers' Neighborhood season 8 =

Mister Rogers' Neighborhood
- Season 8
- No. of episodes: 65

Release
- Original network: PBS

Season chronology
- ← Previous; Season 7 Next → Season 9

The following is a list of episodes from the eighth season of the PBS series, Mister Rogers' Neighborhood, which aired in 1975. The first broadcast of Mister Rogers' Neighborhood was on the National Educational Television network on February 19, 1968.

== Episode 1 (Frisbee) ==
Rogers sees the offices of Audrey Cleans Everything. Purple Panda returns to the Neighborhood of Make-Believe, as does a lady who now calls herself "Barbara B. Frisbee".

- Aired on February 17, 1975.

== Episode 2 (Frisbee) ==
Lady Aberlin gives Daniel a tap-dancing lesson. When Barbara B. Frisbee jokes about her enormous frisbee, Lady Elaine decides that a giant will visit the Neighborhood of Make-Believe.

- Aired on February 18, 1975.

== Episode 3 (Frisbee) ==
Rogers lends his antique car to Mr. McFeely. He hears an organist play a fugue by Bach in Negri's Music Shop. Lady Elaine is still frightening people with talk that the giant frisbee is for a giant.

- Aired on February 19, 1975.

== Episode 4 (Frisbee) ==
Rogers gets Barbara Russell's help to remove an ink spot that is on his shirt. Barbara B. Frisbee wants everyone to guess what the frisbee is for. X gets the correct guess.

- Aired on February 20, 1975.

== Episode 5 (Frisbee) ==
Rogers sees tap dancers at Betty's Little Theater. Lady Aberlin helps give X an understanding about clothes and those who wear them.

- Aired on February 21, 1975.

== Episode 6 (Prince Tuesday is Missing) ==
Queen Sara is looking for Prince Tuesday. It leads to an appeal on MGR-TV.

- Aired on February 24, 1975.

== Episode 7 (Building Blocks) ==
Rogers builds with blocks and sees a llama at the McFeelys' house. Some wonder what the Platypus family intends to do with wood blocks.

- Aired on February 25, 1975.

== Episode 8 (old toy horse) ==
Rogers illustrates how magnetism works and plays horseshoes with Bob Trow. In the Neighborhood of Make-Believe, Lady Aberlin brings back the old toy horse from years gone by.

- Aired on February 26, 1975.

== Episode 9 (Platypus Return Home) ==
Rogers compares the difference between a chromaharp and a standing harp.

- Aired on February 27, 1975.

== Episode 10 (Platypus Return Home) ==
Lady Aberlin is doing a remote broadcast at MGR-TV to welcome the Platypus family home. This includes an in-studio visit with the Sweetheart trio.

- Aired on February 28, 1975.

== Episode 11 (The Royal Family Visit Westwood) ==
Rogers discusses fasteners before hearing a string quartet practice. In the Neighborhood of Make-Believe, the Royal family packs for a visit to Westwood and they want Bob Dog to accompany them.

- Aired on March 3, 1975.

== Episode 12 (The Royal Family Visit Westwood) ==
The Royal Family is about to visit Westwood, but someone has to fetch King Friday's bass.

- Aired on March 4, 1975.

== Episode 13 (The Royal Family Visit Westwood) ==
Jean Worthley of Hodgepodge Lodge tells Rogers about how to make a terrarium. Tad Frogg is jealous of H.J. Elephant because he has played constantly with Prince Tuesday.

- Aired on March 5, 1975.

== Episode 14 (The Royal Family Visit Westwood) ==
Chef Brockett makes noodle pudding. Edgar is anxious for the Royal family to return. He is asked to bring his noodle pudding to Westwood.

- Aired on March 6, 1975.

== Episode 15 (The Royal Family Visit Westwood) ==
Rogers talks of the ways people can welcome others. The Neighborhood of Make-Believe also happens to welcome the Royal family home.

- Aired on March 7, 1975.

== Episode 16 (Wishing and Pretending) ==
Mr. McFeely shows Rogers leopard frogs. Prince Tuesday wishes the Frogg family would visit.

- Aired on March 10, 1975.

== Episode 17 (Wishing and Pretending) ==
Rogers discusses the fact that, unlike humans, tadpoles transform into frogs. In the Neighborhood of Make-Believe, the Frogg family visits. Prince Tuesday is worried that all his wishes will come true.

- Aired on March 11, 1975.

== Episode 18 (Wishing and Pretending) ==
Rogers mixes his own modeling dough and sees a sculptor at Elsie Neal's Craft Shop. Lady Elaine reports on MRG-TV that Prince Tuesday is missing. When he is found, he tells his worries about wishes.

- Aired on March 12, 1975.

== Episode 19 (Wishing and Pretending) ==
The Brown Marionette Theater is preparing to perform Little Red Riding Hood. Lady Aberlin wants to act as Red Riding Hood. X will pretend with her only if he is called "Pretend Wolf".

- Aired on March 13, 1975.

== Episode 20 (Little Red Riding Hood) ==
Rogers and McFeely take tickets at the Brown's Marionette Studio and watch the Browns' production of Little Red Riding Hood.

Note: Bob Brown and Judy Brown last episode

- Aired on March 14, 1975.

== Episode 21 (A Place Of Our Own) ==
Rogers shows that a captain's lap desk has many compartments. Another such desk is delivered to the Neighborhood of Make-Believe while Purple Panda and Black-and-White Panda visit.

- Aired on March 17, 1975.

== Episode 22 (A Place Of Our Own) ==
Audrey Roth shows Rogers how her mobile home converts from an office to a living room. The Neighborhood of Make-Believe is curious about a tent that has mysteriously appeared overnight.

- Aired on March 18, 1975.

== Episode 23 (A Place Of Our Own) ==
Rogers hears François Clemmons, John Costa and Bert Lloyd playing and singing music at Clemmons' studio. In the Neighborhood of Make-Believe, the reformed Mr. Allmine invites Daniel and Lady Aberlin to his museum in the Land of Allmine.

- Aired on March 19, 1975.

== Episode 24 (A Place of Our Own) ==
Residents of the Neighborhood of Make-Believe try to find Lady Aberlin and Daniel, who did not ask permission to go to the Land of Allmine.

- Aired on March 20, 1975.

== Episode 25 (A Place Of Our Own) ==
Rogers goes to Brockett's Bakery, where guests are preparing egg-drop soup and fortune cookies. Lady Aberlin and Lady Elaine discuss the differences between a merry-go-round and the Museum-Go-Round.

- Aired on March 21, 1975.

== Episode 26 (A Dentist and a Tooth Fairy) ==
Mr. Rogers has a dental exam. In the Neighborhood of Make-Believe, Edgar Cooke plays Tooth Fairy to take one of Daniel's baby teeth.

- Aired on March 24, 1975.

== Episode 27 (Energy Crisis) ==
Rogers goes to Negri's Music Shop to demonstrate the difference between a piano and an organ. Al Worden returns to the Neighborhood of Make-Believe, which is running low on electricity.

- Aired on March 25, 1975.

== Episode 28 (Energy Crisis) ==
Rogers visits an exhibition of kinetic art at Elsie Neal's Craft Shop. He then shows how he can slow the speed of the Trolley. The Trolley does end up going slow in the Neighborhood of Make-Believe, as their energy source is drained to the marrow.

- Aired on March 26, 1975.

== Episode 29 (Energy Crisis) ==
Rogers and Bob Trow discuss efficient energy use. In the Neighborhood of Make-Believe, Al Worden receives the solar power system needed to restore energy there.

- Aired on March 27, 1975.

== Episode 30 (Deliveries I Have Made) ==
Rogers brings a St. Bernard to the McFeelys' house and draws a song there. In the Neighborhood of Make-Believe, MGR-TV gives Mr. McFeely his own show.

- Aired on March 28, 1975.

== Episode 31 (Key to Otherland) ==
Rogers sees the world's largest guitar at Negri's Music Shop. Handyman Negri also plays it in the Neighborhood of Make-Believe. Reardon calls King Friday and says he will create an opera about swans.

- Aired on March 31, 1975.

== Episode 32 (Key to Otherland) ==
Rogers operates a machine that simulates the sound of waves crashing onto the shore. In the Neighborhood of Make-Believe, several neighbors propose the parts they wish to play in the upcoming opera.

- Aired on April 1, 1975.

== Episode 33 (Key to Otherland ) ==
Chef Brockett and Jeff Edwards make taffy at Brockett's Bakery. In the Neighborhood of Make-Believe, Lady Aberlin decides to use taffy and a key in the opera.

- Aired on April 2, 1975.

== Episode 34 (Key to Otherland) ==
Rogers brings a combination lock to a raffle game held at Betty's Little Theater. In the Neighborhood of Make-Believe, Mr. Allmine lands a role in the opera.

- Aired on April 3, 1975.

== Episode 35 (Key to Otherland) ==
Lady Aberlin plays a girl whose brother finds a key in the sand. She dreams the key opens the door to another land, full of swans, beavers, and a witch with a diabolical passion.

- Aired on April 4, 1975.

== Episode 36 (Neighborhood in Lockdown) ==
King Friday offers John Reardon a high office in the Neighborhood of Make-Believe, but Reardon is not sure he wants to stay.

- Aired on April 7, 1975.

== Episode 37 (Neighborhood in Lockdown) ==
Reardon is homesick and must leave the Neighborhood of Make-Believe. Rogers helps the McFeelys make glider planes.

- Aired on April 8, 1975.

== Episode 38 (Neighborhood in Lockdown) ==
King Friday declares no one may leave the Neighborhood of Make-Believe without his permission. Lady Elaine defies the rule because of her leaf mat. Rogers visits Anne Pellowski, who tells one African folk tale and one Turkish story.

- Aired on April 9, 1975.

== Episode 39 (Neighborhood in Lockdown) ==
Betty Aberlin is at a beauty parlor, discussing with Rogers uniforms and the people who wear them. In the Neighborhood of Make-Believe, Lady Aberlin is ordered to put Lady Elaine under house arrest.

- Aired on April 10, 1975.

== Episode 40 (Neighborhood in Lockdown) ==
Rogers invites a baton twirler to his television house. Later, Mrs. McFeely shows a film on her work with a bookmobile. Everyone in the Neighborhood of Make-Believe has stayed inside. King Friday now realizes he must revoke his rule that no one leaves without his permission.

- Aired on April 11, 1975.

== Episode 41 (Corny New Saw) ==
Rogers sees Bob Trow make a jigsaw puzzle. Those in the Neighborhood of Make-Believe get an understanding of King Friday's rule allowing careful travel.

- Aired on April 14, 1975.

== Episode 42 (Corny New Saw) ==
Rogers helps Natalie Baker look at an apartment she may rent. In the Neighborhood of Make-Believe, Corny gets a new saw but refuses to part with his old one.

- Aired on April 15, 1975.

== Episode 43 (Flea Market ) ==
Mr. McFeely shows a film of his visit to a flea market. In the Neighborhood of Make-Believe, Corny is reluctant to throw his old saw away.

- Aired on April 16, 1975.

== Episode 44 (Flea Market ) ==
Rogers helps the Baker family move into their new apartment. The Neighborhood of Make-Believe is nearing its flea market, but Corny decides to keep his old saw.

- Aired on April 17, 1975.

== Episode 45 (Flea Market) ==
Rogers goes to Betty's Little Theater to see Ella Jenkins perform with Susan Linn and her puppets. In the Neighborhood of Make-Believe, Lady Elaine stages the flea market.

- Aired on April 18, 1975.

== Episode 46 (African culture) ==
Rogers listens to African music. In the Neighborhood of Make-Believe, Lady Aberlin gets different reactions about her turban from different neighbors.

- Aired on April 21, 1975.

== Episode 47 ( Boomerang ) ==
Paul Gertner, a magician, shows a few tricks in Rogers' kitchen. In the Neighborhood of Make-Believe, X and Henrietta must inform Bob Dog the truth about magic tricks.

- Aired on April 22, 1975.

== Episode 48 (Boomerang ) ==
Rogers watches as a piano is delivered to Mrs. Baker's apartment. Lady Elaine Fairchilde bothers people with her boomerang. Lady Aberlin finds that boomerang is just what she needs.

- Aired on April 23, 1975.

== Episode 49 (Boomerang) ==
It's Upside Down Amateur Hour on MGR-TV. Caused from Lady Elaine, Lady Aberlin pours water upside down.

- Aired on April 24, 1975.

== Episode 50 (Mrs. Rogers’s piano recital) ==
Rogers plays back a tape of his wife's piano recital. The Neighborhood of Make-Believe welcomes back Professor Scanlon, who performs magic tricks.

- Aired on April 25, 1975.

== Episode 51 (A Rainbow for Prince Tuesday) ==
Rogers sees a stained glass expert at Bob Trow's workshop. In the Neighborhood of Make-Believe, King Friday sends McFlee on a search for a rainbow for Prince Tuesday.

- Aired on April 28, 1975.

== Episode 52 (A Rainbow for Prince Tuesday) ==
Lady Elaine stages a bird show at MGR-TV.

- Aired on April 29, 1975.

== Episode 53 (A Rainbow for Prince Tuesday) ==
Mr. McFeely continues his search for a rainbow by entering the Land of Allmine. He and Mr. Allmine find a rainbow trout.

- Aired on April 30, 1975.

== Episode 54 (A Rainbow for Prince Tuesday) ==
Rogers sees Sylvia Bubalo making greeting cards at Elsie Neal's Craft Shop. In the Neighborhood of Make-Believe, Lady Elaine interviews a butterfly on MGR-TV. Mr. McFeely still can't find a rainbow.

- Aired on May 1, 1975.

== Episode 55 (A Rainbow for Prince Tuesday) ==
On an overcast day, Rogers shows an umbrella. Chef Brockett prepares a fruit dish. It rains in the Neighborhood of Make-Believe, prompting a rainbow for Prince Tuesday and everyone else.

- Aired on May 2, 1975.

== Episode 56 (Tony Bennett) ==
Rogers and Marilyn Barnett watch Vija Vetra dance. In the Neighborhood of Make-Believe, Tony Bennett sings on MGR-TV and does a sketch of Lady Elaine.

- Aired on May 5, 1975.
- This is the first episode that welcomes Tony Bennett in the Neighborhood of Make-Believe. Bennett is the celebrity guest on that episode.

== Episode 57 (King Friday’s Birthday) ==
Rogers sees gymnasts work the bars and sideboards at a gymnasium. In the Neighborhood of Make-Believe, Lady Aberlin informs several neighbors that King Friday's birthday is coming.

- Aired on May 6, 1975.

== Episode 58 (King Friday’s Birthday) ==
Walter Brown weaves baskets at Trow's workshop. In the Neighborhood of Make-Believe, X and Henrietta think of birthday presents for King Friday.

- Aired on May 7, 1975.

== Episode 59 (King Friday’S Birthday) ==
Mister Rogers brings bean bags, and shows how Don Rapp makes them at Elsie Neal's Shop. In the Neighborhood of Make Believe, Daniel is making Bean bags for the King's Birthday.

- Aired on May 8, 1975

== Episode 60 (King Friday’s Birthday) ==
It's King Friday's birthday, and Lady Elaine has a song for him as part of the Neighborhood-wide celebration.

- Aired on May 9, 1975
- Featured future actor Michael Keaton as a member of "Flying Zookeeni Brothers"

== Episode 61 (King Friday friend) ==
Fred McFalls, one of Rogers' college friends, has made a sculpture of Rogers. In the Neighborhood of Make-Believe, King Friday announces that his college friend, who is a lizard, will visit later in the week.

- Aired on May 12, 1975.

== Episode 62 (King Friday friend) ==
Daniel is afraid the visiting lizard will eat him up. King Friday reassures everyone that his friend is a vegetarian. Not only that, but "Princess Margaret H. Lizard" (whom the lizard is named) can change into a witch.

- Aired on May 13, 1975.

== Episode 63 (King Friday Friend) ==
Margaret Hamilton visits the television house to discuss with Rogers her work in The Wizard of Oz as the Wicked Witch. She appears in the Neighborhood of Make-Believe as a princess who is sometimes a lizard. This Princess Margaret is about to stage a festival for remembering the past.

- Aired on May 14, 1975.
- Margaret Hamilton is welcomed as a celebrity guest who could have a chance to star as a princess who is sometimes a lizard.
- This is Ellsie Neal's last appearance.

== Episode 64 (Remembering Pass Visits) ==
Mister Rogers plays tapes of past television visits, including a segment from the wedding of King Friday and Queen Sara. In the Neighborhood of Make-Believe, Princess Margaret H. Witch presents a crystal ball that shows the past and tells the future.

- Aired on May 15, 1975.

== Episode 65 (Crystal Ball) ==
Princess Margaret H. Witch leaves the crystal ball to the Neighborhood of Make-Believe. At Brockett's Bakery, Rogers sees John Costa's mother making bread.

- Aired on May 16, 1975.
