= Mister Rogers' Neighborhood season 1 =

Mister Rogers' Neighborhood
- Season 1
- No. of episodes: 130

Release
- Original network: PBS
- Original release: February 19 – August 16, 1968

Season chronology
- Next → Season 2

The following is a list of episodes from the first season of the PBS (at the time NET) series Mister Rogers' Neighborhood. The first broadcast of Mister Rogers' Neighborhood on the NET network was on February 19, 1968. Within the series history, this has produced the most episodes in one season.

== Episode 1 ==
Mrs. Russellite (played by Barbara Russell) sends an invitation to Mister Rogers to see her lampshade collection. Lady Elaine's changes to the geography of the Neighborhood of Make-Believe worry King Friday, who begins to impose new rules and restrictions in Make-Believe, and builds a wall.

- Song- "I Like You As You Are"
- Aired on February 19, 1968.
- This series started out as a continuation of MisteRogers (1961)
- King Friday XIII, Lady Elaine Fairchilde, Daniel Striped Tiger, Henrietta Pussycat, X the Owl, Joe (Handyman) Negri, and Mr. McFeely are introduced in this episode. (Lady Elaine is not actually seen in the series until episode 5.)

== Episode 2 ==
Mr. Rogers shows how a burlap bag can be many different things when one imagines it. After he turns it into a cape, Betty (Lady) Aberlin comes to visit and he lends it to her for strength when she goes to visit her great-uncle, King Friday XIII. Meanwhile, King Friday worries about an invasion of people who want to change the Neighborhood of Make-Believe and drafts her as a border guard.

- Songs- "It's Afternoon", "Be Brave"
- Aired on February 20, 1968.
- Betty Aberlin and Edgar Cooke are introduced in this episode.

== Episode 3 ==
Mister Rogers receives a package from Chef Brockett. Because of the new rules and restrictions in Make-Believe, Cornflake S. Pecially refuses to visit the castle. Chef Brockett delivers a cake to King Friday, who is suspicious of more changes, cuts the cake into many pieces to inspect it.

- Songs- "I'd Like To Be Just Like My Mom", "It's an Ugly Day"
- Aired on February 21, 1968.
- Cornflake S. Pecially and Chef Brockett are introduced in this episode.

== Episode 4 ==
At the Television house, Mr. Rogers brings in a playpen and puppy. Mrs. Carol Saunders also makes her first visit. At the Neighborhood of Make-Believe, King Friday still wants to protect his province, so he sends Handyman Negri to install punch clocks at both ends of it.

- Aired on February 22, 1968.
- Grandpère is introduced in this episode.

== Episode 5 ==
After Mr. Rogers plays with them, Betty Aberlin takes some helium balloons to the Neighborhood of Make-Believe. Tagging them with a message of peace, she floats them above the castle. When King Friday reads the message, he ceases his efforts to stop change. The wall is taken down. Mister Rogers sings his special family bedtime song called, "Good Night, God" for the first time.

- Aired on February 23, 1968.

== Episode 6 ==
To prepare for his scientific endeavour, Mr. Rogers puts on a lab coat and compares various shells and shell-like objects, including a turtle shell, a conch shell, an armadillo's armored shell and a suit of armour. In the Neighborhood of Make-Believe, Bud Alder compares oil-based and water-based paints. After sharing his wisdom with X the Owl, X teaches Lady Elaine various bird names.

- Aired on February 26, 1968.

== Episode 7 ==
In the Television house, Mr. Rogers takes care of a canary while, in the Neighborhood of Make-Believe, Lady Elaine is studying birds and learns from Lady Aberlin how practice is needed to learn anything. The "art lady", Mrs. Rubin visits.

- Songs- "I Like You As You Are", "You've Got To Learn Your Trade"
- Judy Rubin is introduced in this episode.
- Aired on February 27, 1968.

== Episode 8 ==
The Neighborhood of Make-Believe celebrates a peace party and honors sixteen year- old majorette Lynda Martha as a guest, while Lady Elaine Fairchilde dresses up as a dove of peace.

- Songs include "Peace and Quiet", which was composed for this occasion.
- Aired on February 28, 1968.

== Episode 9 ==
Mr. Rogers plays audio tapes of Neighborhood of Make-Believe puppet characters in an effort to allow the viewers guess who they are. In the Neighborhood of Make-Believe, Royal Coach Saunders plays hide and seek with Lady Elaine and X.

- Songs- "Everybody's Fancy"
- Aired on February 29, 1968.
- Royal Coach Saunders is introduced in this episode.

== Episode 10 ==
In the Television house, Mr. Rogers demonstrates the use of binoculars. In the Neighborhood of Make-Believe, Lady Aberlin dresses up as a snow goose.

- Aired on March 1, 1968.

== Episode 11 ==
Mr. Rogers brings oatmeal and Picture Picture explains how it's made. Mime Walker is in Make-Believe. Henrietta thinks X has been spending too much time with Lady Elaine. X alleviates it by inviting Henrietta bird watching. Mr. Rogers' eldest son, James, comes to play with clay and makes a baseball diamond.

- First "How People Make..." segment, one of the show's signature recurring features.
- This is James Rogers's first appearance in the show.
- Aired on March 4, 1968.

== Episode 12 ==
Mister Rogers brings in a toucan. Jewel Walker visits the television house, where he transforms into Mime Walker. He heads to Make-Believe, where he helps X learn arithmetic with a musician who is playing a French horn for X.

- Songs- "I Think I'll be a Clown"
- Aired on March 5, 1968.

== Episode 13 ==
Mister Rogers sits on the porch swing listening to the symphony rehearse, and afterwards plays with two different kinds of dominoes. In Make-Believe, Marion Petrov dances for King Friday and Lady Elaine steals King Friday's painting of the Bluebird of Happiness.

- Songs- "Sometimes People are Good"
- Aired on March 6, 1968.

== Episode 14 ==
Mister Rogers plays the 4th movement of Brahm's Symphony No 1 and improvises on paper how music in a song makes him feel. Mr. McFeely treats Mister Rogers to a visit with Honey, a chimpanzee from the zoo. Professor Joseph Fitzpatrick is introduced to the Neighborhood of Make-Believe and he discusses Seurat.

- Song(s)- "I Like You As You Are"
- Aired on March 7, 1968.

== Episode 15 ==
Mister Rogers bandages his finger to prove that it is still there even behind the bandage. Vivian Richman introduces folk songs "This Little Light of Mine" and "He's Got the Whole World in His Hands". Dr. Marchl visits the neighborhood of Make-Believe for the first time.

- Songs- "It's Good To Talk"
- Aired on March 8, 1968.

== Episode 16 ==
In this episode, the puppet character Donkey Hodie appears for the first time. Mister Rogers arrives at his house with some lumber scraps and uses nails to hammer some of the pieces together to make a boat. In the Neighborhood of Make-Believe, artist Virgil Cantini visits and shows King Friday some of his nail sculptures. Lady Aberlin knits a sweater for Henrietta Pussycat. X the Owl wants a gift too, so Lady Aberlin promises to knit him a scarf.

- Aired on March 11, 1968.

== Episode 17 ==
A young donkey named Jenny is visiting Mister Rogers on the porch. Back in the house, he, Lady Aberlin, and Mr. McFeely play a game of Pin the Tail on the Donkey. In the Neighborhood of Make Believe, Donkey Hodie has just arrived and is looking for a place to live. He assures Lady Aberlin and Henrietta Pussycat that he no longer bites.

- Songs- "I'd Like To Be Just Like My Mom"
- Aired on March 12, 1968.

== Episode 18 ==
Mister Rogers puts together a clarinet and plays a few notes. He talks about his childhood clarinet lessons and remembers that he did not practice enough. In the Neighborhood of Make-Believe, clarinetist Loius Paul performs for King Friday and talks about the importance of practice. Mrs. Russellite, played by Barbara Russell brings a pinwheel to Henrietta and is introduced to Donkey Hodie, who is staying in the Tree until he finds a place to live. The pinwheel gives Donkey Hodie the idea to live in a windmill.

- Aired on March 13, 1968.

== Episode 19 ==
Mister Rogers arrives with a toy raft made out of straws. He plays with it and other floating toys in a tub of water. In the Neighborhood of Make-Believe, Scientist Alder is checking the wind velocity for Donkey Hodie, who is looking for a place with a good wind to build his windmill. He decides the best place would be in the hills behind the Castle, but King Friday objects because he wants his privacy. Back at the house, Mister Rogers shows different kinds of fans.

- Aired on March 14, 1968.

== Episode 20 ==
Mister Rogers brings in a model windmill and talks about how windmills work. Judy Rubin, the “Art Lady,” shows some windmills made by children. She and Mister Rogers make windmills of their own. In the Neighborhood of Make-Believe, Daniel tells Handyman Negri he thinks that King Friday is afraid of Donkey Hodie's biting. Maybe that's the reason the King won't allow Donkey Hodie to put his windmill near the castle. When Donkey Hodie convinces the king that he doesn't bite anymore, the king changes his mind.

- Debut of King Friday's pet wooden bird on a stick
- Aired on March 15, 1968.

== Episode 21 ==
Chef Brockett is ready for Donkey Hodie to break ground for the windmill. Brockett also brings in a snowman made from dough.

- Aired on March 18, 1968.

== Episode 22 ==
Mister Rogers covers this episode discussing the White House and the U.S. presidents. Meanwhile, Coach Saunders and King Friday do exercises inside the castle.

- Songs- "You're Growing"
- Aired on March 19, 1968.

== Episode 23 ==
Mister Rogers discusses the use of eyeglasses and Picture Picture shows how they are made. Henrietta also receives glasses from Nurse Miller.

- Songs- "Everybody's Fancy", "What Would You Like To Do Today"
- This episode aired on Fred Rogers' 40th birthday.
- Aired on March 20, 1968.

== Episode 24 ==
Mr. Rogers has his eyes examined. King Friday wants Donkey Hodie's windmill to be built somewhere else.

- Aired on March 21, 1968.

== Episode 25 ==
Mr Rogers brings a plant and transfers it to a bigger pot. King Friday is visiting with a man who restores antique furniture. Lady Aberlin, X and Henrietta bring housewarming gifts for Donkey Hodie at his home in "someplace else".

- Aired on March 22, 1968.

== Episode 26 ==
Mr. Rogers discusses growing and changes a doll's diapers. A friend brings his 5-month-old baby for a short visit. Nurse Miller also assures Tadpole Frogg he is growing at just the right pace. Mr. Rogers then shows a video of Jamie, his eldest son when he was 14 months old on picture picture. Jamie (a.k.a. James), who is now 8 years old, comes to visit and sing the "tomorrow" song with his dad before they leave.

- Aired on March 25, 1968.

== Episode 27 ==
Mr. Rogers makes a toy bed and pretends to make a doll sleep in it. Lady Elaine also wants Edgar Cooke's pillow.

- Aired on March 26, 1968.

== Episode 28 ==
At the television house, someone sends a rather unusual box. After he locks his pillow in a safe, Edgar Cooke expresses his different feelings. Lady Elaine Fairchilde finds her special toy, which is a boomerang.

- Songs- "Please Don't

Think It's Funny"

- Aired on March 27, 1968.

== Episode 29 ==
Mr Rogers demonstrates the use of a small loom and takes a trip to see the large ones being operated by Nantucket Weavers. In Make-Believe, a four string quartet plays for King Friday. In closing, Mr Rogers sings and plays "Good Night, God" on his piano.

- Songs- "I Like You As You Are",
- Aired on March 28, 1968.

== Episode 30 ==
After Mr. Rogers demonstrates the use of violins and violas, he invites Michael Grebanier to play his cello. In the Neighborhood of Make-Believe, Lady Elaine has a new boomerang trick that is turning everything upside down.

- Aired on March 29, 1968.

== Episode 31 (Red Monster) ==
Mr. Rogers discusses wild animals and Mr. McFeely brings in a Mexican parakeet.

- Aired on April 1, 1968.

== Episode 32 (Red Monster) ==
Mr. Rogers puts on various masks to prove he doesn't change when he puts one on. The Neighborhood of Make-Believe is trying to trace out what is believed to be a red monster.

- Aired on April 2, 1968.

== Episode 33 (Red Monster) ==
Mr. Rogers gives some oranges to the members of a ballet company that is set to perform "The Sad Monster Ballet".

- Aired on April 3, 1968.

== Episode 34 (Red Monster) ==
Mr. Rogers plays music by blowing across bottles of water. Mr. McDonald also makes a visit to play a section of Die Miestersinger on the tuba. The Neighborhood of Make-Believe summons Digger Digorum to search for the mysterious red monster.

- Aired on April 4, 1968.

== Episode 35 (Red Monster) ==
Mr. Rogers and Chef Brockett make their own tunnels from what is around them. The Neighborhood of Make-Believe finally concludes no red monsters are in the tunnels.

- Aired on April 5, 1968.

== Episode 36 ==
Mister Rogers visits Mr. Dennis who is demonstrating how to make rattan chair seats by hand. In Make-Believe, Digger Digorum bears gifts as she leaves the Neighborhood of Make-Believe.

- Aired on April 8, 1968.

== Episode 37 ==
Inside the Television house, Peggy Lipschutz draws with chalk while Vivian Richman plays guitar and sings four songs, along with Joe Davidson on banjo, and Charles Kubelik on bass violin. Songs include a song in Hebrew, based on Psalms 133, "John Henry" and "This Land is Your Land".

- Songs- "Let's Go Right Away"
- Aired on April 9, 1968.

== Episode 38 ==
Mr. Rogers demonstrates exercises by using a stationary exercise bicycle and free weights. He then sings "I Like You As You Are". Lady Betty Aberlin tries out the exercise bike. In Make-Believe, Sara Saturday, who had been the damsel in distress a week earlier and frightened by the monster, is welcomed to the Neighborhood of Make-Believe. Lady Aberlin sings "Then Your Heart Is Full Of Love".

- Aired on April 10, 1968.
- (Queen) Sara Saturday is introduced in this episode.

== Episode 39 ==
The Neighborhood of Make-Believe is preparing to hold a reception party for Sara Saturday. Handyman Negri goes to a men's fashion show at the Museum-Go-Round so he can find the perfect outfit for the reception.

- Aired on April 11, 1968.

== Episode 40 ==
The reception party for Sara Saturday takes place.

- Aired on April 12, 1968.

== Episode 41 ==
Mister Rogers talks about sewing, and shows a needlepoint creation of the Neighborhood of Make-Believe. Corny, X and Henrietta have various reactions to the rain in the Neighborhood of Make-Believe. Lady Aberlin and X sing "Creation Duet".

- Aired on April 15, 1968.

== Episode 42 ==
Lady Aberlin gives X the scarf that she had promised for him after she visits with Daniel Striped Tiger and they sing "I Like You As You Are". In turn, X gives her a walnut, and she takes it to the new trading tower that Grand-père has established.

- Aired on April 16, 1968.

== Episode 43 ==
Mister Rogers talks about missing people and plays a harmonica, then his piano. He plays about his feelings. In Make Believe, John Reardon appears for the first time. King Friday asks him to make an opera, and Reardon gets started on it right away. Back at the house, Mr Rogers shows how to write music on a chalkboard.

- Aired on April 17, 1968.

== Episode 44 ==
Mr Rogers takes care of a baby chimpanzee. Reardon holds auditions for his opera while Mrs. Frogg provides the costumes. Sara Saturday has to babysit during the opera so Henrietta decides to be a babysitter in the opera.

- Songs- When a Baby Comes to Your House, I'm Taking Care of You, Today Is New
- Aired on April 18, 1968.

== Episode 45 ==
During Reardon's opera, Lady Aberlin hires Henrietta to look after Donkey Hodie.

- Aired on April 19, 1968.
- This is the first opera within the Mister Rogers' Neighborhood series.

== Episode 46 Haircut ==
Mr. Rogers gets a haircut while discussing with the barber how it doesn't hurt. The same barber also cuts Corny's hair and a gymnast named Bernard is in Make Believe.

- Aired on April 22, 1968.

== Episode 47 ==
Mr Rogers reads a book that depicts Henrietta and X the Owl. They are flattered when Lady Aberlin shows them. Nicholas and Marion Petrov visit the Neighborhood of Make-Believe dressed up as X the Owl and Henrietta Pussycat. They dance in both costumes and in leotards.

- Aired on April 23, 1968.

== Episode 48 ==
Mr Rogers brings a dachshund and shows a book with all types of dogs. Chef Brockett, who is in apple-giving mood, gives apples, applesauce and apple juice. Mr Rogers and Chef Brockett bob for apples in the kitchen. Mr McFeely brings a poodle before they all leave for the day.

- Aired on April 24, 1968.

== Episode 49 ==
Mr. Rogers uses drinking straws to demonstrate the use of blowing soap bubbles. Mrs. Rubin also shows paintings that were all done with straws. King Friday is missing Sara Saturday. Lady Aberlin invites everyone to the castle to see a dancer named Paul Draper.

- Aired on April 25, 1968.

== Episode 50 ==
Mr. McFeely brings over a battery operated steam shovel. Dr. Marchl enjoys Grand-père's machine because it responds to all French words. Marchl then talks with Henrietta and X about the way boys and girls do things differently.

- Aired on April 26, 1968.

== Episode 51 ==
Mime Walker pantomimes Goldilocks and the Three Bears as Grand-père tells the story. Mr. Rogers also gets to see a real trained bear.

- Aired on April 29, 1968.

== Episode 52 ==
In the Television house, Katie Lewin tells Mr. Rogers how puzzles are made. In the Neighborhood of Make-Believe, Handyman Negri and Daniel organize their own play retitled as "Benjamin Franklin and the Three Bears" at the request of X.

- Aired on April 30, 1968.

== Episode 53 ==
Mr. Rogers discusses Benjamin Franklin and reads about Franklin as a boy. The Neighborhood of Make-Believe expands their play into becoming "Goldilocks, Benjamin Franklin, and the Three Bears".

- Aired on May 1, 1968.

== Episode 54 ==
Alder demonstrates how heat causes things to change. X prints signs to advertise the play. King Friday wants a part in it and the title is expanded to "King Friday, Goldilocks, Benjamin Franklin and the three bears".

- Aired on May 2, 1968.

== Episode 55 ==
The Neighborhood of Make-Believe stages the play "King Friday, Goldilocks, Benjamin Franklin and the three bears".

- Aired on May 3, 1968.

== Episode 56 ==
Mr. Rogers brings in a basket of vegetables. Chef Brockett also shows cooked vegetables to both Rogers and the Neighborhood of Make-Believe.

- Aired on May 6, 1968.

== Episode 57 ==
Mr. Rogers discusses rabbits with Mr. McFeely, who brings some to the porch. A friend brings over a bunny marionette. Henrietta is bored and is cheered up by a familiar face. It turns out to be Joey Hollingsworth in disguise returning from a trip around the world where he learned new styles of dance and sold many "Rockit" rocking chairs for Corny.

- Aired on May 7, 1968.

== Episode 58 ==
Mr. Rogers talks about the arrival of a new baby after he puts together a toy dollhouse made all out of wood. Meanwhile, Corny is too busy to spend a lot of time with Joey Hollingsworth. King Friday is also unwilling to give too much of his time.

- Aired on May 8, 1968.

== Episode 59 Tools ==
Mr. Rogers demonstrates the use of three tools, a hacksaw, a hammer, and a screwdriver. Handyman Negri comes to fix Rogers' sink. Tadpole Frogg expresses his sadness for thinking he had broken a fountain.

- Aired on May 9, 1968.

== Episode 60 ==
Mr. Rogers demonstrates using a clown marionette and a dance recital by Joey Hollingsworth is prepared in the Neighborhood of Make-Believe. Daniel and Lady Aberlin play a clapping game. It is at the request of Sara Saturday that the recital is planned. King Friday tries to blunt the dance recital by forbidding applause and moving the start time forward, as he tries to woo Sara Saturday.

- Songs- "The Clown In Me"
- Aired on May 10, 1968.

== Episode 61 ==
Mister Rogers makes mud pies and a dam with dirt and water. Professor Fitzpatrick illustrates the difference between a calm sea and a rough sea through showing famous paintings and then drawing with charcoal. Corny and Joey Hollingsworth are digging a well together and as a result, they will be able to sell more rockers. Joey is ready to go on another selling trip for Corny but before he goes, Joey shows Daniel how a water pump works and gives one more little dance.

- "Sometimes People Are Good"
- Aired on May 13, 1968.

== Episode 62 ==
With pipes now carrying water into Corny's factory, Corny sends a water-filled goblet and cup to King Friday.

- Aired on May 14, 1968.

== Episode 63 Fire ==
Mister Rogers warms some wiener buns in his oven so that Chef Brockett and Mr. McFeely can enjoy them. In the Neighborhood of Make-Believe, everyone has turned their attention on the fire that has completely burned down Corny's factory. King Friday and Henrietta are especially frightened. Chef Brockett and Lady Aberlin help to put out the fire. Corny is devastated, so Daniel shows kindness by inviting him to stay with him at his Clock until the factory is ready again. Mr. Rogers talks about how many things can be scary when they are out of control, such as fires.

- "I Think I'm Going To Like Today"
- Aired on May 15, 1968.

== Episode 64 Firemen ==
Mr. Rogers discusses firemen. Picture Picture shows what firemen do before they go to help people. Mr. McFeely helps Mr. Rogers put on a fireman's outfit and pretend rescues a doll. He also sings "Sometimes I Don't Understand". In Make-Believe, Handyman Negri and Daniel help Corny to process his sad and mad feelings, giving him hope from his distressed state. Handyman Negri gets right to work, rebuilding Corny's factory. Lady Elaine is worried that everyone thinks she started the fire, but we learn that even she can be an imp, she never wants to hurt anyone. She and Mr. Negri find the most important pieces of the factory. They sing the "Sometimes People are Good" song.

- Aired on May 16, 1968.

== Episode 65 ==
Lady Aberlin, Handyman Negri, and X rebuild all of Corny's factory. Everyone donates something to help, including King Friday.

- Aired on May 17, 1968.

== Episode 66 ==
Mr. Rogers explains how all toys do what you want them to do. His son, John, also makes his first appearance on the show to play with model antique cars. Meanwhile, at the Neighborhood of Make-Believe, Corny's newly rebuilt factory offers to help Mime Jewel Walker in his go-cart play-act.

- Aired on May 20, 1968.

== Episode 67 ==
King Friday is ready to dedicate the new factory, but Lady Elaine senses he is afraid of elevators. This changes some of the dedication.

- Aired on May 21, 1968.

== Episode 68 ==
Mr. Rogers brings all different kinds of toy bicycles, and explains the difference between them, tricycles, and unicycles. He sings the "Everybody's Fancy" song. He also then attends a children's dance class taught by Miss Nelson and Bruce of Dimension 5 records, and is introduced to Bruce's "musical computer". Later, Blackberry the cat comes to visit before accompanying Mr. Rogers back home.

- Aired on May 22, 1968.

== Episode 69 ==
Mr Rogers reads a poem he wrote. Donkey Hodie has had no visitors at his unseen home and wants some to come.

- Aired on May 23, 1968.

== Episode 70 Glass Blowing ==
Mr Rogers shows glass blown animals made by Mr. Zandhuis, who then comes to show how glass is blown into different shapes, such as a swan. Henrietta must tell everyone how to get to "Someplace Else", which is where Donkey Hodie lives. Lady Aberlin coerces the king to come with them by telling him one of his famous speeches is expected. Everyone travels from the Neighborhood of Make-Believe to his mysterious home at the Windmill so that Donkey Hodie can get his wish of visitors all day long. Mr Rogers sings "Once Upon Each Lovely Day".

- Aired on May 24, 1968.

== Episode 71 ==
In the kitchen, Mr. Rogers shows how he was taught how to brush his teeth. On Picture Picture there is a film of his last dentist visit. In the Neighborhood of Make-Believe, Mr. McFeely brings Donkey Hodie some mouthwash, while Sara Saturday returns to the Castle to the dance room where Vija Vetra is doing a dance for each little story the onlookers tell. Sara Saturday gives them all a piece of the pretend rainbow, which is her way of promising to return.

- Aired on May 27, 1968.

== Episode 72 ==
Mr Rogers brings liquid plant food and talks about how to take care of a growing plant. He sings "You're Growing". Mrs. Rubin brings art gift containers made by her students. King Friday and Handyman Negri take up a campaign against littering in the Neighborhood of Make-Believe, starting with a census.

- Aired on May 28, 1968.

== Episode 73 ==
Mr Rogers sings "Let's Go Right Away". Lady Elaine is derided for throwing litter around as a protest. What she really has wanted is one of Chef Brockett's cookies.

- Aired on May 29, 1968.

== Episode 74 ==
Mr Rogers does some ironing and washing clothes. Major Smith gives King Friday a citation to start the Neighborhood of Make-Believe clean-up campaign.

- Aired on May 30, 1968.

== Episode 75 ==
Lady Aberlin dresses up as X so she can welcome Miss Emilie, who has been ill for some time. But first, at the house with Mister Rogers, Emilie Jacobson recites one of her poems about coming home.

- Aired on May 31, 1968.

== Episode 76 ==
At the television house, Mister Rogers brings dolls of all kinds. Betty Aberlin visits to finish making a doll for King Friday. Dr. Marchl gets opinions from Corny, Mrs. Frogg, and Lady Aberlin. She is trying to cheer up King Friday, who has been missing Sara Saturday.

- Aired on June 3, 1968.

== Episode 77 ==
Lady Aberlin enlists several teenagers to try to entertain King Friday.

- Aired on June 4, 1968.

== Episode 78 ==
Rogers takes care of Mr Mc Feely's cat. Handyman Negri is making a list for King Friday. At his instructions, Negri writes "Sara Saturday" on the S page and agrees that he will call her within a day.

- Aired on June 5, 1968.

== Episode 79 ==
King Friday gets advice on how to contact Sara Saturday. Once she is reached, Sara invites him to visit her at her home.

- Aired on June 6, 1968.

== Episode 80 ==
Mr Rogers shows telephone line equipment and a video. For a while, King Friday has been reluctant to see Sara Saturday outside the Neighborhood of Make-Believe. He finally comes to a decision on this.

- Aired on June 7, 1968.

== The Mister Rogers' Neighborhood Assassination Special (1968) ==
A primetime special. Rogers discusses the impact of the assassinations of Martin Luther King, Jr. and Robert F. Kennedy on children.

- Aired on June 7, 1968

== Episode 81 ==
John Reardon pretends to be a mailman while he visits the Neighborhood of Make-Believe. He sends a note that King Friday and Edgar Cooke are staying with Sara Saturday a few extra days. Lady Elaine, meanwhile, wants to set up a campsite at the Castle garden.

- Aired on June 10, 1968.

== Episode 82 ==
Mister Rogers sings "Let's Go Right Away" and Jim Wright sets up a tent both inside Rogers' television house and in the Neighborhood of Make-Believe. Lady Elaine is using the tents as the centerpiece for her upcoming opera. Back at the house, Mister Rogers sings "I Like To Be Told".

- Aired on June 11, 1968.

== Episode 83 ==
Mister Rogers brings one of the first kinds of instant developing cameras to the house. Lady Elaine is beginning to develop her own opera, but Reardon has no idea what kind she is making with camping equipment. At lady Elaine's request, he gets his own covered wagon.

- Aired on June 12, 1968.

== Episode 84 ==
Reardon and Lady Aberlin are trying to get King Friday's permission for their opera. Lady Elaine is a campsite owner in the opera and is not pleased with some guests that appear.

- Aired on June 13, 1968.

== Episode 85 ==
After he brings in a kitten, Mister Rogers and Miss Emilie, "the poetry lady", reflect on one of Vija Vetra's dances and Miss Emile brings a special poem.

- Aired on June 14, 1968.

== Episode 86 ==
Lady Elaine won't remove the tents from the castle garden, so Handyman Negri dresses as a great crested grebe to try and scare her away.

- Aired on June 17, 1968.

== Episode 87 ==
Rogers has got a new aquarium. His first fish to go in it are two catfish. In the Neighborhood of Make-Believe, Lady Aberlin tries to remove the tents from the Castle garden.

- Aired on June 18, 1968.

== Episode 88 ==
Mr. McFeely brings two piglets into the television house. A visitor to the Neighborhood of Make-Believe coaxes Lady Elaine to move her tents to Someplace Else.

- Aired on June 19, 1968.

== Episode 89 ==
Mister Rogers brings a suitcase full of different kinds of clothing, and explains how to say it's raining in different languages. Miss Emilie pays a visit with a poem about rain. Having been away for a while, King Friday returns to the neighborhood bearing gifts.

- Aired on June 20, 1968.

== Episode 90 ==
Mister Rogers brings signs to talk about. After Betty Aberlin visits to bring a gift from King Friday and Sara Saturday, she goes back to Make-Believe to hear King Friday's announcement that everyone will get a big surprise next week.

- Songs- "I'm Taking Care Of You", "I Like To Be Told"
- Aired on June 21, 1968.

== Episode 91 ==
Mister Rogers builds a wood frame. Handyman Negri is building a new balcony on the castle.

- Aired on June 24, 1968.

== Episode 92 ==
Rogers and Mr. McFeely take care of two ducks that have wandered onto the porch before seeing the Vagabond Marionettes' production of Rumpelstiltskin.

- Aired on June 25, 1968.

== Episode 93 ==
A special guest is supposed to enter the Neighborhood of Make-Believe. Lady Aberlin takes Lady Elaine's boomerang. But the guest's identity remains a secret, and in her frustration Lady Aberlin accidentally turns King Friday upside down.

- Aired on June 26, 1968.

== Episode 94 ==
Lady Aberlin pantomimes the growth of a plant in the television house. She also presents a flower arrangement for Sara Saturday, who is revealed to be the special guest.

- Aired on June 27, 1968.

== Episode 95 ==
King Friday prepares Sara Saturday's room in the castle.

- Aired on June 28, 1968.

== Episode 96 ==
Mr. McFeely shows Rogers how to blow bubbles by using liquid detergent. He also gives out liquid detergent samples to the Neighborhood of Make-Believe. Meanwhile, Daniel thinks that King Friday and Sara Saturday will marry.

- Aired on July 1, 1968.

== Episode 97 ==
After Mister Rogers tries on many different types of shoes, Handyman Negri sees that communication with the Neighborhood of Make-Believe is intact by repairing the "telecan". Norma Canner and her young students perform dance steps for King Friday.

- Aired on July 2, 1968.

== Episode 98 ==
Mr. Farnum and his daughter Cindy Farnum discuss stones and how they are cut and polished for jewelry. Mr. Anybody makes his first visit and decides he'll be a stonesmith. Mr. Anybody gives stones to several neighbors in the Neighborhood of Make-Believe. King Friday selects stoned for mounting on rings for Sara Saturday and himself.

- Aired on July 3, 1968.

== Episode 99 ==
The Neighborhood of Make-Believe celebrates Scottish Day. Mister Rogers invites Mr. Anybody (Don Franke) back who comes in full Scottish attire and a real Scottie dog. A Scottish performance takes place for the King, including a bagpipe player.

- Aired on July 4, 1968.

== Episode 100 ==
Mistee Rogers shows the comparison between two different scales: one to weigh groceries and one to weigh humans. Nurse Miller gives physicals to the neighbors. Lady Elaine refuses to cooperate, turning King Friday upside-down.

- Songs' "I'm Taking Care of You"
- Aired on July 5, 1968.

== Episode 101 ==
Rogers demonstrates several types of different whistles. Mr. Anybody plays a whistle in the Neighborhood of Make-Believe and gives one to the Trolley.

- Aired on July 8, 1968.

== Episode 102 ==
Mister Rogers pretends to give aid to a sick person. Nurse Miller also gives a shot to Tadpole Frogg who is sick.

- Songs- "Please Don't Think It's Funny", "I'm Taking Care of You"
- Aired on July 9, 1968.

== Episode 103 ==
Rogers talks of playing with toys and reads the poem of The Land of Counterpane by Robert Louis Stevenson. In the Neighborhood of Make-Believe, Tadpole Frogg and Lady Aberlin pretend to roller skate. Lady Aberlin finds out that King Friday and Sara Saturday are in the R Room of the Castle.

- Aired on July 10, 1968.

== Episode 104 ==
Mister Rogers makes drums out of tin cans and listens to a real drummer. In the Neighborhood of Make-Believe, Mr. Anybody is a "one-man-band" and decides to anchor a neighborhood orchestra.

- Aired on July 11, 1968.

== Episode 105 ==
Rogers demonstrates how the xylophone works. John Costa, who is on the accordion, joins Rogers on several song duets. The Neighborhood of Make-Believe orchestra holds a concert for King Friday and Sara Saturday.

- Aired on July 12, 1968.

== Episode 106 ==
Rogers discusses fairy tales. He reads Little Red Riding Hood and explains what parkas are. Mr. McFeely shows a parka his children sent him for his upcoming birthday. In the Neighborhood of Make-Believe, Lady Aberlin and Daniel play peek-a-boo, which involves some other neighbors. As a kind act, Lady Aberlin gives hoods to several neighbors.

- Aired on July 15, 1968.

== Episode 107 ==
Rogers is weaving a basket for Mr. McFeely's birthday. Bernie Jessol, Lowell Meek, and Akeba Blazia also perform gymnastics at the Castle.

- Aired on July 16, 1968.

== Episode 108 ==
Rogers brings in a mother turtle and a baby turtle. Miss Emilie shares a book about animals. She also shares with Corny and Henrietta what gifts they will give for Mr. McFeely's birthday.

- Aired on July 17, 1968.

== Episode 109 ==
Jan Zandhuis presents a small glass bicycle to Rogers that he made for Mr. McFeely's birthday. In the Neighborhood of Make-Believe, Daniel has a gift for Mr. McFeely, but accidentally he breaks it.

- Aired on July 18, 1968.

== Episode 110 ==
Rogers' television house is the site of Mr. McFeely's birthday party. King Friday and Sara Saturday offer a gift.

- Aired on July 19, 1968.

== Episode 111 ==
Rogers discusses how a piano works and then shows a film on how people make pianos. Van Cliburn plays piano at the Neighborhood of Make-Believe.

- Aired on July 22, 1968.

== Episode 112 ==
Rogers shows how to express your anger on the drums. Dr. Marchl tells Lady Elaine Fairchilde the difference between reality and dreams.

- Aired on July 23, 1968.

== Episode 113 ==
Lady Elaine has trouble sleeping in the Neighborhood of Make-Believe.

- Aired on July 24, 1968.

== Episode 114 ==
Lady Elaine wants to turn King Friday upside-down with her Boomerang, but it backfires and the whole Neighborhood turns upside-down.

- Aired on July 25, 1968.

== Episode 115 ==
Rogers pretends to ride a camel through the sand, while Donkey Hodie is bothered by sand blowing from Lady Elaine's sandbox.

- Aired on July 26, 1968.

== Episode 116 ==
Lady Aberlin and Handyman Negri don a horse costume in which they dance for King Friday and Sara Saturday.

- Aired on July 29, 1968.

== Episode 117 ==
Rogers shows how a foot measurer works. The Neighborhood of Make-Believe begins preparations for a fair.

- Aired on July 30, 1968.

== Episode 118 ==
Rogers displays an assortment of Native American clothing and witnesses Native American dancers on the Picture Picture screen. In the Neighborhood of Make-Believe, Lady Elaine Fairchilde wants to be a cowgirl for the fair. Both King Friday and Daniel Tiger demonstrate activities at their booths.

- Aired on July 31, 1968.

== Episode 119 ==
Officer Clemmons arrives to show what a badge represents. He then issues a permit for the Neighborhood of Make-Believe street fair.

- Aired on August 1, 1968.

== Episode 120 ==
It's raining in the neighborhood, so Rogers brings in his umbrella. The Neighborhood of Make-Believe appears sad because the rain there is threatening to spoil the street fair.

- Aired on August 2, 1968.

== Episode 121 ==
Rogers, Chef Brockett, and Mr. McFeely decorate doughnuts. Joey Hollingsworth returns to the Neighborhood of Make-Believe and shares with Chef Brockett a magic recipe for peanut butter cookies.

- Aired on August 5, 1968.

== Episode 122 ==
Rogers shows how to use a pair of flippers and an inner tube for scuba. A scuba diver discusses the equipment that she uses. In the Neighborhood of Make-Believe, Joey Hollingsworth and Daniel Tiger sail a boat in the Froggs' pond.

- Aired on August 6, 1968.

== Episode 123 ==
Rogers brings in light bulbs. Scientist Alder has flashlights and the batteries that make them work. X anticipates his gift from Joey Hollingsworth.

- Aired on August 7, 1968.

== Episode 124 ==
Rogers talks about all sorts of sports that are played with a ball (such as football, soccer and baseball). In the Neighborhood of Make-Believe, Joey Hollingsworth performs a dance with a magic ball.

- Aired on August 8, 1968.

== Episode 125 ==
Rogers sets up a punching bag, explaining how some people punch a bag when they are angry, saying that rules must be followed in boxing. The Neighborhood of Make-Believe has a surprise for Joey Hollingsworth.

- Aired on August 9, 1968.

== Episode 126 ==
Rogers discusses the difference between a rooster and a hen. He also makes a chicken marionette.

- Aired on August 12, 1968.

== Episode 127 ==
Lady Aberlin draws portraits of Corny and Daniel for a book for Sara Saturday, who is going away for a while.

- Aired on August 13, 1968.

== Episode 128 ==
Mr Rogers shows how to tie a shoe, and also explains the meaning of the word "disappear," which isn't always exactly what it seems. With Officer Clemens, The Neighborhood of Make-Believe bids goodbye to Sara Saturday, but she and King Friday declare that she will return. Officer Clemens sings "I Like to Be Told".

- Aired on August 14, 1968.

== Episode 129 ==
Mr Rogers sings "Let's Be Together Today" and Mr McFeely lends him an animal number book. Robert Troll makes his first visit to the Neighborhood of Make-Believe because he wants to see Sara Saturday in Westwood. However, he must wait a day for Westwood's wise women.

- Aired on August 15, 1968.
- Robert Troll is introduced in this episode.

== Episode 130 ==
Robert Troll is still appreciative. Fortunately, he meets Gloria Onque, one of Sara Saturday's wise women. She is about to meet with King Friday.

- Aired on August 16, 1968.
- This is the last episode to be aired in black and white. In addition, this is the only season to be broadcast this way, and is also the only season with more than a hundred episodes in a single year.
