= Chook raffle =

Australian tradition of raffling

Chook raffle is an Australian tradition of "raffling off", often in clubs or pubs, a "chook", which is an Australian slang term for a chicken. Most often the chicken is prepared by a butcher, but live chickens are sometimes raffled. The chook raffle is a special case of a meat raffle, but is more often used as a fund-raising activity by an amateur club or organisation.

Perhaps because of this association, the expression tends to be used disparagingly about someone who claims to have, or should have, superior organisational skills, that they "couldn't run a chook raffle". The term is also used to describe any random process. An example is selecting the winner of an election by drawing a name from a hat, said to be turning the process into a "chook raffle".

It can also be used to describe any selection process where the outcome appears to be random, rather than based on a clearly defined set of criteria.
