= Mister Rogers' Neighborhood season 10 =

Mister Rogers' Neighborhood
- Season 10
- No. of episodes: 17

Release
- Original network: PBS

Season chronology
- ← Previous; Season 9 Next → Season 11

The following is a list of episodes from the tenth season of the PBS series, Mister Rogers' Neighborhood, which aired in 1979 and 1980. The first broadcast of Mister Rogers' Neighborhood was on the National Educational Television network on February 19, 1968.

== Episode 1 (Mister Rogers Talks with Parents About School) ==
Rogers is one of a handful of panelists who discuss easing the fear children have about starting school.

- Aired on August 27, 1979.

== Episode 2 (Mister Rogers Goes to School) ==
Mister Rogers takes his television neighbors to a kindergarten classroom at the local school. Prior to beginning the Neighborhood of Make-Believe segment, he disguises the Trolley as a school bus with a cardboard cover. The disguise arouses everyone's attention in the neighborhood. It gets to the point where King Friday decrees that a school should be built in the neighborhood within three days. After scouting four locations, Lady Aberlin and Handyman Negri decide that the school should be built at Someplace Else. Harriet has agreed to be the teacher for Ana, Daniel, and Prince Tuesday.

- Aired on August 27, 1979.
- This is the first time, the porch entrance and exit are used in the show.

== Episode 3 (Mister Rogers Goes to School) ==
In the Neighborhood of Make-Believe, Lady Elaine attempts to get the children ready for school. Mister Rogers visits the "real" neighborhood school again, this time learning from the first-grade teacher.

- Aired on August 28, 1979.

== Episode 4 (Mister Rogers Goes to School) ==
Mister Rogers gets a beginner's drum lesson at Negri's Music Shop. He also discovers Mr. McFeely is learning to type, prompting an unusual quartet version of Everybody's Fancy. In the Neighborhood of Make-Believe, Daniel tells Lady Aberlin his fears about starting school.

- Aired on August 29, 1979.

== Episode 5 (Mister Rogers Goes to School) ==
Rogers goes to Negri's Music Shop to have some pictures taken of him behind seaside-postcard illustrations of a pirate, a parrot, and a tiger. The Neighborhood of Make-Believe is about to see the school at Someplace Else open.

- Aired on August 30, 1979.

== Episode 6 (Mister Rogers Goes to School) ==
The new school at Someplace Else opens, with an inviting atmosphere for Ana, Prince, and Daniel. To finish his school lecture, Mister Rogers rides on a real school bus.

- Aired on August 31, 1979.

== Episode 7 (Mister Rogers Talks to Parents About Superheroes) ==
This panel program previews the upcoming week of Mister Rogers' Neighborhood devoted to children's fears and beliefs. It includes footage of Rogers' talk with actors Bill Bixby and Lou Ferrigno about The Incredible Hulk television series.

- Aired on February 3, 1980.
- This episode was one of the few to be shown to a live audience.

== Episode 8 (Mister Rogers Talks About SUPERHEROES™) ==
Rogers finds Trow making wooden blocks. He asks Rogers to use something "super" to use in his invention. Before leaving, Rogers watches Mr. McFeely's video clip of a dinosaur painting. The Neighborhood of Make-Believe is full of scary talk. Prince Tuesday has been having bad dreams about a dinosaur wearing a crown. He also tries to counter with a "super funnel."

- Aired on February 4, 1980.

== Episode 9 (Mister Rogers Talks About SUPERHEROES™) ==
Rogers brings model dinosaurs and takes viewers to a hall of dinosaur skeletons at a natural history museum. A dinosaur with a crown appears in the Neighborhood of Make-Believe, although it is really a skeptical Purple Panda in a costume. This is all part of Lady Elaine's ploy to scare the neighbors.

- Aired on February 5, 1980.

== Episode 10 (Mister Rogers Talks About SUPERHEROES™) ==
Rogers visits Universal Studios to see Bill Bixby and Lou Ferrigno during a shoot of The Incredible Hulk. The Neighborhood of Make-Believe residents are still in awe of the Purple Panda dinosaur.

- Aired on February 6, 1980.

== Episode 11 (Mister Rogers Talks About SUPERHEROES™) ==
Rogers returns to the film studios to speak with Lou Ferrigno and Bill Bixby. Mr. McFeely shows his video of Ferrigno in make-up to look like The Incredible Hulk. In the Neighborhood of Make-Believe, everyone discusses the Purple Panda dinosaur. Lady Aberlin wishes to prove that the dinosaur is not real.

- Aired on February 7, 1980.

== Episode 12 (Mister Rogers Talks About SUPERHEROES™) ==
Rogers remembers the day he operated a backhoe and a tracked loader. At his bakery, Chef Brockett reveals how he makes tapioca pudding. Everyone in the Neighborhood of Make-Believe now hatches a plan to reveal that Purple Panda is the one playing to be a dinosaur.

- Aired on February 8, 1980.

== Episode 13 (Mister Rogers Makes an Opera) ==
Guest Jay O'Callahan tells a story about a king trapped in an enormous soap bubble. When King Friday asks for a bubble that lasts, no one can help, until Reardon calls.

- Aired on May 19, 1980.

== Episode 14 (Mister Rogers Makes an Opera) ==
Rogers finds a bubble-making machine and a knitting machine at Bob Trow's workshop. Mr. McFeely shows a video of how people make sweaters in a factory. Reardon also visits the Neighborhood of Make-Believe. Lady Aberlin decides she will be a sweater-maker for an upcoming opera.

- Aired on May 20, 1980.

== Episode 15 (Mister Rogers Makes an Opera) ==
Rogers sees Chef Brockett's treats made from bananas. In the Neighborhood of Make-Believe, the school children provide ideas for the upcoming opera.

- Aired on May 21, 1980.

== Episode 16 (Mister Rogers Makes an Opera) ==
Mister Rogers visits a weather station and helps launch a weather balloon. In the Neighborhood of Make-Believe, Handyman Negri is named to play the Wind in the upcoming Bubbleland Opera.

- Aired on May 22, 1980.

== Episode 17 (Mister Rogers Makes an Opera) ==
In the opera "Windstorm in Bubbleland", a news team promises "There's never any trouble here in Bubbleland." What they do not know is that a windstorm is approaching. It's the by-product of a chemical company's aerosol spray. While all the residents are worried about their bubbles, Hildegarde Hummingbird strives to protect the people from the giant wind.

- Aired on May 23, 1980.
- This was one of the few operas of the series to take up the entire 30 minutes of the episode.
- This is one of the only episodes in the show's history that does not feature the show's logo in the opening. Instead, about 8 seconds into the beginning, the episode title, "Mister Rogers Makes an Opera", appears.
- This is also the only episode in the show's history where Mister Rogers does not change into his sweater. Instead, he is already in it when he enters the porch.
