= Mister Rogers' Neighborhood season 11 =

Mister Rogers' Neighborhood
- Season 11
- No. of episodes: 18

Release
- Original network: PBS

Season chronology
- ← Previous; Season 10 Next → Season 12

The following is a list of episodes from the eleventh season of the PBS series, Mister Rogers' Neighborhood, which aired in 1981. The first broadcast of Mister Rogers' Neighborhood was on the National Educational Television network on February 19, 1968.

== Episode 1 (Mister Rogers Talks to Parents About Divorce) ==
Rogers fields questions from parents about divorce.

- Aired on February 15, 1981.

== Episode 2 (Divorce) ==
Mr. McFeely relives memories of his wedding. Previewing the Neighborhood of Make-Believe storyline, Prince Tuesday befriends a girl whose parents are divorced. This episode has 2 make-believe segments in one show.

- Aired on February 16, 1981.

== Episode 3 (Divorce) ==
Rogers visits the Sturgis Pretzel House to see people making pretzels. In the Neighborhood of Make-Believe, King Friday and Queen Sara squabble about buying a new plane. It upsets Prince Tuesday to the boiling point.

- Aired on February 17, 1981.

== Episode 4 (Divorce) ==
Rogers recalls the day he test-drove an electric car. Later he meets Jeff Erlanger, a boy in an electric wheelchair, who demonstrates his wheelchair and describes some of his physical handicaps. The Neighborhood of Make-Believe continues its all-out search for Prince Tuesday. When he is found, he has a mix of emotions.

- Aired on February 18, 1981.

== Episode 5 (Divorce) ==
Joe Negri shows Rogers a rack of musical instruments that have either been repaired or are in need of repair. They meet Earl Grollman, a counselor who has written a book on divorce for children. Prince Tuesday finally shares his emotions with his family.

- Aired on February 19, 1981.

== Episode 6 (Divorce) ==
Rogers wears a false face to show that he is still himself inside. The Royal Electric Plane-Car arrives via a clown courier. Behind the mask is Chuck Aber, who has been divorced and doesn't see much of his children. Thus, Prince Tuesday can relate to Aber's feelings. Corny reveals his secret: he is now making rocking-chair-shaped pretzels. Mister Rogers shows viewers the ins and outs of an airplane.

- Aired on February 20, 1981.

== Episode 7 (Mister Rogers Talks to Children and Parents About Violence) ==
Prompted by news coverage of the death of John Lennon and the failed assassination attempts of President Ronald Reagan and Pope John Paul II, Rogers talks to children and their parents about violence in the media. Rogers shows video footage of himself at schools, discussing why people murder, young children. The special aired only once but it was later uploaded to the internet 35 years later, during a time when its subject matter was again a much-discussed issue.

- Aired on May 25, 1981.

== Episode 8 (Mister Rogers Talks to Parents About Competition) ==
Rogers discusses with parents combative attitudes.

- Aired on May 31, 1981.

== Episode 9 (Mister Rogers Talks About COMPETITION) ==
Rogers shows a film on how people make crayons. King Friday decrees a "Draw the Neighborhood" Contest, something which Lady Elaine wants to win.

- Aired on June 1, 1981.

== Episode 10 (Mister Rogers Talks About COMPETITION) ==
Mister Rogers visits an art museum to look carefully at the various genres of paintings that are on display. In the Neighborhood of Make-Believe, Henrietta is upset when she hears that Big Bird (from Sesame Street) will visit X.

- Aired on June 2, 1981.

== Episode 11 (Mister Rogers Talks About COMPETITION) ==
After reflecting on his discussion with Andrew Wyeth, Rogers helps to console Chef Brockett. The Neighborhood of Make-Believe welcomes Big Bird, who enters his drawing for the "Draw the Neighborhood" Contest. He also realizes right away that Henrietta is not very welcoming, but assures her that he's just passing through and would never take her best friend.

- Aired on June 3, 1981.
- This is the first series episode to feature a character from another PBS TV show.
- Caroll Spinney, the voice of Big Bird, had agreed to appear in this episode as he had done similar dialogue with Fred Rogers in an episode of Sesame Street that had aired a few weeks earlier. When Spinney received the script for the show, which required him to remove his costume and discuss the inner workings of the Big Bird puppet, he refused on behalf of Jim Henson because he didn't believe in ruining the illusion of Big Bird for the children.

== Episode 12 (Mister Rogers Talks About COMPETITION) ==
Rogers meets Lynn Swann at a dance class. Swann enters in his Pittsburgh Steeler uniform, then changes into something more suitable for a dance lesson. As the Neighborhood of Make-Believe Drawing Contest nears an end, Lady Aberlin discovers that Ana has drawn a picture of the Neighborhood and all its neighbors.

- Aired on June 4, 1981.

== Episode 13 (Mister Rogers Talks about COMPETITION) ==
Mister Rogers wants to create a rainbow, but he needs Mr. McFeely's help. King Friday selects the winner of the "Draw the Neighborhood" contest.

- Aired on June 5, 1981.

== Episode 14 (Mister Rogers Talks About PLAY) ==
Bob Dog volunteers to get a ball that is stuck in the Tree, but he falls and hurts his leg. When King Friday hears of the accident, he bans play from the Neighborhood of Make-Believe.

- Aired on July 20, 1981.

== Episode 15 (Mister Rogers Talks About PLAY) ==
Lady Elaine is so incensed with King Friday's no-play rule that she moves herself and the Museum-Go-Round to another neighborhood.

- Aired on July 21, 1981.

== Episode 16 (Mister Rogers Talks About PLAY) ==
In defiance of King Friday's rule, the schoolchildren set up a play area in the area where the Museum-Go-Round used to be. Prince Tuesday challenges King Friday upfront about the no-play rule.

- Aired on July 22, 1981.

== Episode 17 (Mister Rogers Talks About PLAY) ==
Rogers visits a plant that makes mushrooms. King Friday realizes just how important play is and repeals the rule, much to everyone's delight. All they need is to inform Lady Elaine.

- Aired on July 23, 1981.

== Episode 18 (Mister Rogers Talks About PLAY) ==
Rogers walks on stilts outside on his porch. Bob Dog and Purple Panda volunteer to talk Lady Elaine to bring the Museum-Go-Round and herself back.

- Aired on July 24, 1981.
- This is the last time the porch entrance and exit are used in this show.
