= Mister Rogers' Neighborhood season 2 =

Mister Rogers' Neighborhood
- Season 2
- No. of episodes: 65

Release
- Original network: PBS

Season chronology
- ← Previous; Season 1 Next → Season 3

The following is a list of episodes from the second season of the PBS series, Mister Rogers' Neighborhood, aired in 1969. The first broadcast of Mister Rogers' Neighborhood was on the National Educational Television network on February 19, 1968.

== Episode 1 (The Froggs are Moving) ==
Mrs. Frogg receives a telegram that says she has been offered a position at the Westwood zoo, but the Frogg family must get permission from King Friday to leave since there will be no one to run the Museum-Go-Round.

- Aired on February 10, 1969.
- This is the first episode of the series to be in color. During season 1, the series aired in black and white.

== Episode 2 (The Froggs are Moving) ==
King Friday needs to find another curator to operate the Museum-Go-Round. The Frogg family cannot leave until Lady Aberlin and others can fill that post. In the meantime, King Friday has a portrait of himself to give to the Frogg family. Handyman Negri also arrives at Rogers' television house to collect a frame for the picture which is sent to the neighborhood on the trolley.

- Aired on February 11, 1969.

== Episode 3 (The Froggs are Moving) ==
Rogers discusses antiques and uses a vacuum cleaner to show how it works. In the Neighborhood of Make-Believe, Lady Elaine applies for the position of Museum-Go-Round curator. Since she knows everything in the Museum, she is awarded the job. This enables the Frogg family to move to Westwood.

- Aired on February 12, 1969.

== Episode 4 ==
The Frogg family moves to their new home in Westwood. Tadpole Frogg expresses his feelings about the move. Lady Elaine Fairchilde, the Museum-Go-Round's new curator, is also pleased with the move.

- Aired on February 13, 1969.

== Episode 5 ==
Rogers brings ducklings into the Television house. For their benefit, he fills a wading pool and both he and François Clemmons feed the ducklings. Lady Aberlin and Lady Elaine discuss the difference between being alive and being a model. Robert Troll tells King Friday that Sara Saturday will soon be arriving from Westwood.

- Aired on February 14, 1969.

== Episode 6 (Sara Moves In) ==
Rogers welcomes a trumpet player to his television house. Sara Saturday also moves back to the Neighborhood of Make-Believe.

- Aired on February 17, 1969.

== Episode 7 (Sara Moves In) ==
Rogers paints the swing on the porch of the television house yellow. The Neighborhood of Make-Believe Castle is closed so King Friday can have important meetings.

- Aired on February 18, 1969.

== Episode 8 (Sara Moves In) ==
The Neighborhood of Make-Believe is in the midst of a change. X the Owl turns the Z on his knothole door into an X, Lady Elaine Fairchilde paints the pillars of her Museum-Go-Round, and Sara Saturday is set to marry King Friday.

- Aired on February 19, 1969.
- With a lot of change in the Neighborhood of Make-Believe because of what is going to happen next week, this is the second time since the first episode of the series to have the midst of a change.

== Episode 9 (Sara Moves In) ==
King Friday and Queen Sara give interviews for their upcoming wedding.

- Aired on February 20, 1969.

== Episode 10 (Sara Moves In) ==
The Castle holds a fashion show of many wedding garments.

- Aired on February 21, 1969.

== Episode 11 (The Royal Wedding) ==
Robert Troll measures the many wedding gifts that are pouring into the Castle.

- Aired on February 24, 1969.

== Episode 12 (The Royal Wedding) ==
Rogers brings mittens and gloves in a briefcase into the television house. In the Neighborhood of Make-Believe, King Friday orders that any guests to the royal wedding must take a bath and wear purple gloves.

- Aired on February 25, 1969.

== Episode 13 (The Royal Wedding) ==
The Neighborhood of Make-Believe stages a variety show, which includes a ballet called "The Purple Glove Ballet".

- Aired on February 26, 1969.

== Episode 14 (The Royal Wedding) ==
Lady Elaine Fairchilde and Handyman Negri give their present for the Royal Wedding by changing the old Castle into a new, larger Castle.

- Aired on February 27, 1969.

== Episode 15 (The Royal Wedding) ==
Rogers, Miss Emile, and Chef Brockett carry out their plans for the Royal Wedding. What nobody knows until late is that King Friday wants the wedding to take place in the redesigned Castle garden.

- Aired on February 28, 1969.
- This episode is the most attractive feature in the series' history that become a classic.

== Episode 16 (Welcome the Platypus Family) ==
While King Friday and Queen Sara are away on their honeymoon, Robert Troll welcomes his old friend, Dr. Bill Platypus, to the Neighborhood of Make-Believe.

- Aired on March 3, 1969.

== Episode 17 (Welcome the Platypus Family) ==
Dr. Platypus and Mrs. Platypus move into the Neighborhood of Make-Believe. X and Henrietta do what they can to accommodate them.

- Aired on March 4, 1969.

== Episode 18 (Welcome the Platypus Family) ==
Rogers shows the insides of a buckeye. In the Neighborhood of Make-Believe, Officer Clemmons helps the Platypus family settle temporarily in the Tree.

- Aired on March 5, 1969.

== Episode 19 (Welcome the Platypus Family) ==
The Platypus family must wait for Digger Digorum to return before they can dig their new platypus home.

- Aired on March 6, 1969.

== Episode 20 (Welcome the Platypus Family) ==
Rogers brings in various shovels, one of which he uses to put down fertilizer. In the Neighborhood of Make-Believe, Henrietta has sewn curtains with a duckbill pattern. These go to the site for the new Platypus mound. Rogers also shares his homemade recipe for making Ice pops.

- Aired on March 7, 1969.

== Episode 21 (Magic Kite) ==
While digging the Platypus family's home, Digger Digorum and Handyman Negri discover a box containing a magic kite.

- Aired on March 10, 1969.

== Episode 22 (Magic Kite) ==
A magician performs many tricks at Rogers' television house. In the Neighborhood of Make-Believe, the magic kite advises everyone, including Digger Digorum.

- Aired on March 11, 1969.

== Episode 23 (Magic Kite) ==
Officer Clemmons pretends to be the voice of the magic kite. This convinces Daniel and then X and Nurse Miller that the kite can talk and sing.

- Aired on March 12, 1969.

== Episode 24 (Magic Kite) ==
X wants the magic kite to be added. Joey Hollingsworth returns just as Corny makes a rocking chair for kites.

- Aired on March 13, 1969.

== Episode 25 (Magic Kite) ==
Joey Hollingsworth returns with news that King Friday and Queen Sara will return on the following Friday. He gives to Corny the orders for chairs that must be filled by that time.

- Aired on March 14, 1969.

== Episode 26 ==
Mr. McFeely brings Lightning, a small horse, first to Rogers' television house and then to the Neighborhood of Make-Believe. He hears Donkey Hodie has broken his arm, but it is an arm of the windmill that has been broken and not one of his real arms.

- Aired on March 17, 1969.

== Episode 27 ==
Rogers plays a Xylophone and visits percussionist Jean Wilmouth. Those in the Neighborhood of Make-Believe are sad because King Friday and Queen Sara are still on their honeymoon.

- Aired on March 18, 1969.

== Episode 28 ==
Edgar Cooke and Joey Hollingsworth, along with Lady Elaine, plan to decorate the Neighborhood of Make-Believe for the Royal family's return.

- Aired on March 19, 1969.

== Episode 29 ==
Joey Hollingsworth is dressed up as King Friday as part of the ceremony to welcome back the Royal couple. Lady Elaine instructs Lady Aberlin to dress as Queen Sara. This causes mass confusion and more discussions.

- Aired on March 20, 1969.

== Episode 30 ==
King Friday and Queen Sara return to the Neighborhood of Make-Believe to find the disguised Joey Hollingsworth and Lady Aberlin.

- Aired on March 21, 1969.

== Episode 31 ==
In the Television house, Rogers plays a matching game. In the Neighborhood of Make-Believe, the Royal Family gives moving frames to X, Henrietta, and Lady Elaine.

- Aired on March 24, 1969.

== Episode 32 ==
Rogers uses a balance scale to compare weights. The Neighborhood of Make-Believe is beginning plans for their upcoming carnival. X and Lady Aberlin demonstrate the talents they will display there.

- Aired on March 25, 1969.

== Episode 33 ==
Chef Brockett must explain cotton candy and carnivals to King Friday, and neither interests him. Lady Elaine gets into her fortune-teller mode for the upcoming carnival.

- Aired on March 26, 1969.

== Episode 34 ==
King Friday puts a damper on the carnival plans because he had not been asked for permission to hold it at the Castle.

- Aired on March 27, 1969.

== Episode 35 ==
With permission from King Friday, the Neighborhood of Make-Believe holds its carnival.

- Aired on March 28, 1969.

== Episode 36 ==
A Wizard enters the Neighborhood of Make-Believe to find Lady Elaine Fairchilde. He plays games and then stubs his toe, prompting Dr. Platypus, who also meets King Friday for the first time.

- Aired on March 31, 1969.

== Episode 37 ==
The Wizard of Lupovich leaves the Neighborhood of Make-Believe, but not without leaving a box for King Friday and others to watch.

- Aired on April 1, 1969.

== Episode 38 ==
Dr. Bill and Elsie Jean Platypus, among others, are curious about the box the Wizard of Lupovich had left for them. When the neighbors gather, the box opens itself to reveal a bunny cap. Anyone who puts it on hops around.

- Aired on April 2, 1969.

== Episode 39 ==
Handyman Negri lets Corny, X, and Henrietta try the hopping cap. Dr. Bill Platypus has also built up a clientele.

- Aired on April 3, 1969.

== Episode 40 ==
Several of those in the Neighborhood of Make-Believe do not like Dr. Bill's new bagpipes. He decides that he will have to find a different place to play them.

- Aired on April 4, 1969.

== Episode 41 ==
Mabel Mercer arrives in the Neighborhood of Make-Believe with a costume changer for Lady Aberlin.

- Aired on April 7, 1969.

== Episode 42 ==
Rogers looks after Carol Saunders' guitar. In the Neighborhood of Make-Believe, Robert Troll raises some mischief.

- Aired on April 8, 1969.

== Episode 43 ==
Robert Troll wants to live at the campsite at Someplace Else since Lady Elaine is not using it anymore. But Robert is too afraid to ask until friends offer him support.

- Aired on April 9, 1969.

== Episode 44 ==
Officer Clemmons has brought a building permit to the Neighborhood of Make-Believe, but he does not know who it is for. The building permit, however, is really for a community center at Someplace Else.

- Aired on April 10, 1969.

== Episode 45 ==
Rogers brings in flower pots filled with orchids, tulips, and daffodils. In the Neighborhood of Make-Believe, King Friday is surprised by the sudden quiet. Everyone is watching Handyman Negri building the community center at Someplace Else.

- Aired on April 11, 1969.

== Episode 46 ==
To combat King Friday's boredom, singer Barbara Koski visits the Neighborhood of Make-Believe from Finland.

- Aired on April 14, 1969.

== Episode 47 ==
Rogers plays house with a set of dolls and two houses. In the Neighborhood of Make-Believe, King Friday orders all the locales to be numbered from west to east, all the way from the Eiffel Tower to the Clock.

- Aired on April 15, 1969.

== Episode 48 ==
Officer Clemmons reminds Rogers that Chef Brockett's birthday will be in two days. In the Neighborhood of Make-Believe, Lady Elaine tells King Friday he cannot always be number 1. This shows that all the house numbers in all the locales are coming down.

- Aired on April 16, 1969.

== Episode 49 ==
Rogers has to keep secret the cake he is making for Chef Brockett's birthday. In the Neighborhood of Make-Believe, Robert Troll, X, and Daniel discuss their gifts for Brockett.

- Aired on April 17, 1969.

== Episode 50 ==
Today is Chef Brockett's birthday. King Friday offers the Atlantic Ocean as his gift.

- Aired on April 18, 1969.

== Episode 51 ==
Rogers puts together a puzzle Chef Brockett has given him as a thank-you present. Handyman Negri leaves the Neighborhood of Make-Believe for a scout jamboree. His replacement for the week is John Reardon.

- Aired on April 21, 1969.

== Episode 52 ==
Reardon is organizing an opera. Daniel, Lady Aberlin, and Dr. Platypus have parts in it.

- Aired on April 22, 1969.

== Episode 53 ==
Reardon distributes music to those who will take part in the opera. Robert Troll wants to be a whale, and Elsie Jean Platypus wants to play the Loch Ness monster.

- Aired on April 23, 1969.

== Episode 54 ==
Lady Aberlin gives the Trolley a wave costume for the opera, which also fools Corny making him want to have a part in the opera. The entire Neighborhood of Make-Believe will be the backdrop, simulating the sea.

- Aired on April 24, 1969.

== Episode 55 (Teddy Bear Opera) ==
The Neighborhood of Make-Believe stages its opera about the search for a lost teddy bear.

- Aired on April 25, 1969.

== Episode 56 ==
Rogers is doing a puzzle, but Mr. McFeely barges in and takes it before it is even finished. In the Neighborhood of Make-Believe, Lady Elaine surprises Handyman Negri, who drops his souvenir from the jamboree.

- Aired on April 28, 1969.

== Episode 57 ==
Rogers discusses the differences between males and females. In the Neighborhood of Make-Believe, Handyman Negri and Lady Elaine assemble a rocket.

- Aired on April 29, 1969.

== Episode 58 ==
King Friday blocks the launch of Handyman Negri and Lady Elaine's rocket until some rules are laid down for it.

- Aired on April 30, 1969.

== Episode 59 ==
Carole Clemmons, François' wife, has some new poems. In the Neighborhood of Make-Believe, Lady Elaine is mad at her improperly-working rocket.

- Aired on May 1, 1969.

== Episode 60 ==
King Friday completes his set of rules for Lady Elaine's rocket. Once these rules are followed, the rocket rides more smoothly.

- Aired on May 2, 1969.

== Episode 61 ==
Rogers builds a model car. Van Cliburn also enters the Neighborhood of Make-Believe gathering parts for the piano Lady Elaine is building.

- Aired on May 5, 1969.

== Episode 62 ==
Chef Brockett has made a piano-shaped cake for Van Cliburn, who performs at the Castle.

- Aired on May 6, 1969.

== Episode 63 ==
Lady Aberlin introduces a magic leaf. When she says the correct words, her aunt will sing for her.

- Aired on May 7, 1969.

== Episode 64 ==
A button band performs for the Neighborhood of Make-Believe, during which Vija Vetra performs a button dance as well.

- Aired on May 8, 1969.

== Episode 65 ==
Queen Sara gives a lesson to Lady Aberlin and King Friday about understanding Robert Troll's troll talk.

- Aired on May 9, 1969.
