= Al Murray's Compete for the Meat =

2011 British comedy quiz show

- Genre: Game show
- Presented by: Al Murray
- Starring: Zöe Salmon
- Voices of: Jim Rosenthal
- Country of origin: United Kingdom
- Original language: English
- No. of series: 1
- No. of episodes: 8

Production
- Production location: BBC Television Centre
- Running time: 45 minutes approx
- Production company: Avalon Television

Original release
- Network: Dave
- Release: 19 May – 7 July 2011

Al Murray's Compete for the Meat (sometimes promoted as just Compete for the Meat) is a British comedy quiz show, loosely based on the concept of a meat raffle, where the contestants compete for a frozen chicken, while the second placed team gets sausages. It was hosted by comedian Al Murray in his guise as The Pub Landlord, and co-hosted by former Blue Peter presenter Zöe Salmon. The first episode was shown on Dave, on 19 May 2011 at 9:00pm.

== Format ==
There are four teams, who each have three people on them: plus a celebrity team, whose points would go to one of the teams of the celebrities' choice just before the final round.

The first round had questions on six topics. For getting a question correct, the team get five points, and for getting an answer "close enough" to the right answer they get 3 points. The losing team get sent to the "Sin Bin", and 3 new competitors are selected from the audience.

The second round is similar to the first round, apart from the team who loses, one of the competitors play the "Last Chance Saloon". The loser of the "Last Chance Saloon" gets sent to the "Sin Bin", while the winner joined the competitors.

The third round is a "On the Buzzer" round. The team with the most points at the end wins the frozen chicken.

== Episodes ==
No.	Celebrity guests	Original release date
1	Dominic Littlewood, Olivia Lee, Peter Shilton	19 May 2011
2	Stuart Baggs, Raef Bjayou, James McQuillan	26 May 2011
3	Kris Akabusi, Danny John-Jules, Robert Llewellyn	2 June 2011
4	Amanda Lamb, Paul McKenna, Tiff Needell	9 June 2011
5	Caprice Bourret, Phil Daniels, Aldo Zilli	16 June 2011
6	Emily Atack, Sarah Jayne Dunn, Martin Offiah	23 June 2011
7	Angellica Bell, Michael Underwood, Antony Worrall Thompson	30 June 2011
8	Ben Collins and Tim Lovejoy	7 July 2011

== Reception ==
Compete for the Meat received mixed reviews from critics. The Metro's Keith Watson said it was, "a waste of a good title" and, "was familiar ground for the Pub Landlord but it wasn't that funny the first time". On the Box's Alasdair Morton said, "Compete for the Meat is diverting, bizarre and broad enough to entertain, and Dave material through-and-through" and, "It’s an intentional throwback to the gameshows and quizzes of yesteryear, with its meat-based prizes, matey team line-ups and Debbie McGee-esque support acts, only skewed through the Al Murray blender".
