= Meat raffle =

Tradition in various countries

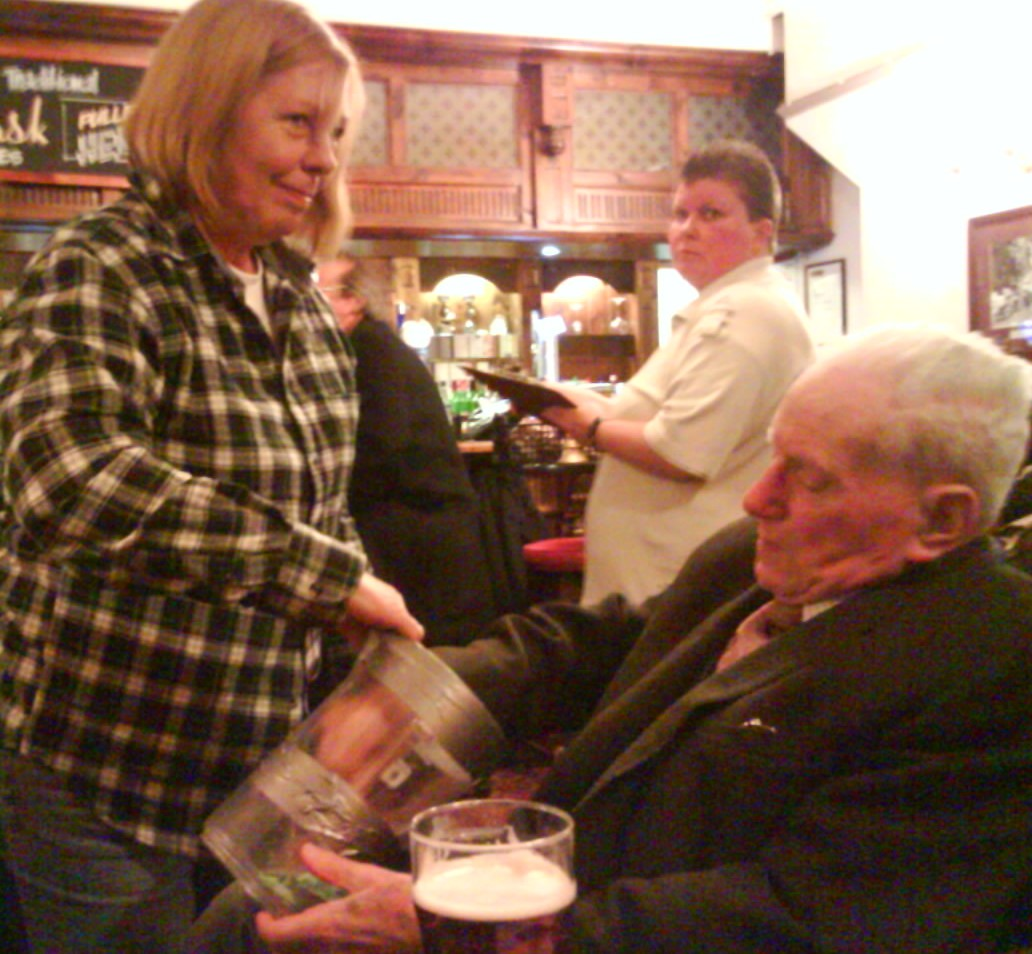
A meat draw underway

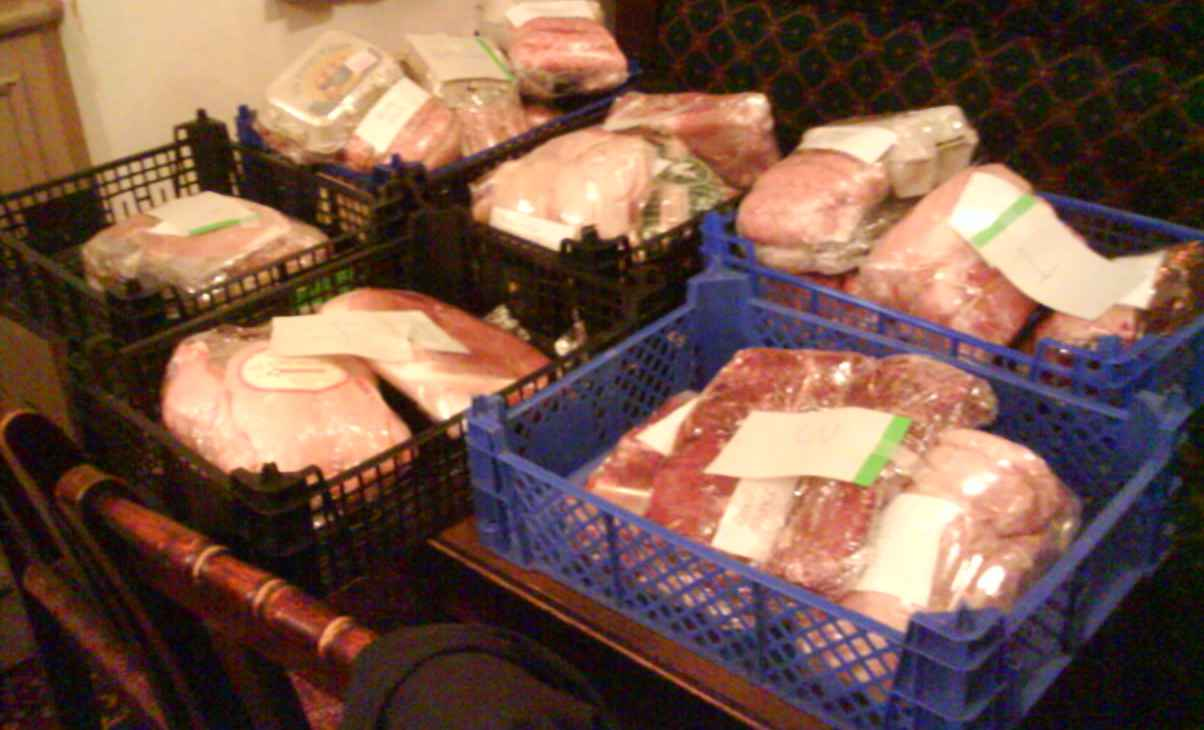
Meat prizes on display

A meat raffle is a tradition of raffling off meat, often in pubs and bars in Australia, in some areas of Britain and the US, and in Western Canada. A meat raffle is also sometimes called a meat draw. In some cases the raffle is operated by a designated charity, though in Britain most of the proceeds are spent on prizes and the raffle is run as a social occasion and a method of enticing customers into a local pub. The meat ranges in animal and cut and often comes from local butchers.

In the UK, a typical meat raffle would have approximately 25-30 tickets sold at £1 each, though there is considerable variation and some raffles are much larger. Depending on the specific raffle, when a winning number is called the winner can either pick their cut of meat or opt for a gift certificate.

Also simply known as a meat tray, the tradition is well known in Australian and New Zealand pubs. The trays of meat raffled vary in content: a barbecue style mix of steaks, lamb chops, sausages, etc. is the most common, however "breakfast trays" (bacon, eggs, sausages) and "seafood trays" (prawns, oysters, mussels) are also common. Meat trays are usually raffled to raise money for local sporting teams, often those associated with the particular pub the raffle occurs in. The proceeds often help fund the team's end of season trip.

An Australian variant of the meat raffle is the chook raffle, where a chicken is raffled off. A Canadian variant popular primarily in the Sudbury area is "Porketta Bingo", in which a traditional Italian porchetta is given as a prize in a card game as a fundraiser for local minor hockey leagues.

Part of the interval at the BDO World Darts Championship included a meat raffle to raise funds for youth teams.

In parts of the US, meat raffles experienced renewed interest in the 2020s.

== In media ==
The Dave TV comedy show Compete for the Meat, hosted by Al Murray, is loosely based on the concept of a meat raffle.

In 2025, a British short film called Meat Raffle, about a character rigging a pub's Christmas turkey prize draw, was released on Channel 4.
