= Mister Rogers' Neighborhood season 7 =

Mister Rogers' Neighborhood
- Season 7
- No. of episodes: 65

Release
- Original network: PBS

Season chronology
- ← Previous; Season 6 Next → Season 8

The following is a list of episodes from the seventh season of the PBS series, Mister Rogers' Neighborhood, which aired in 1974. The first broadcast of Mister Rogers' Neighborhood was on the National Educational Television network on February 19, 1968.

== Episode 1 (Painting The Walls) ==
Rogers starts off the episode by painting the walls of the television house blue. The Neighborhood of Make-Believe is preparing for a Sweethearts' Concert. X gets word that the Owl Correspondence School will send him a lesson.

- Aired on February 18, 1974.
- In this episode, Mister Rogers paints the walls of the television house blue. From Seasons 2-3, the walls of the television house were painted yellow with the brown wooden bottom panels. From Seasons 4-6, The walls of the television house were painted a brighter yellow, but more of a tan color, and the brown wooden bottom panels were removed from the walls. Parts of the kitchen set were also updated. The walls of the television house would stay blue until the end of the series in 2001. Beginning with this episode, Mister Rogers says "You're alive" in a higher toned voice.
- This is the first episode to use what would become the show's more-familiar neighborhood toy-like model town, and it was used until the end of the series in 2001.

== Episode 2 (Make-Believe Sweetheart Concert) ==
Rogers finishes painting the walls of the television house blue. In the Neighborhood of Make-Believe, a mischievous Prince Tuesday empties Miss Paulifficate's purse during the Make-Believe Sweethearts Concert.

- Aired on February 19, 1974.

== Episode 3 (Making a Pizza) ==
Rogers sees how pizza is made by observing two guests at Brockett's Bakery. In the Neighborhood of Make-Believe, Miss Paulifficate's pizza dough, thrown in the air, lands with an OCS lesson attached.

- Aired on February 20, 1974.

== Episode 4 (The model train set) ==
Bob Trow sets up a train display at his workshop, where he and Rogers discuss relative size. The potato train arrives with a package from the Owl Correspondence School for Harriet Elizabeth Cow. She is to help X learn about safety.

- Aired on February 21, 1974.

== Episode 5 (The Circus coming to Make Believe) ==
Elsie Neal brings a decoration she made from horse chestnuts. Later Ezra Jack Keats, returned from Japan, visits Rogers. The Neighborhood of Make-Believe invites the circus from Westwood.

- Aired on February 22, 1974.

== Episode 6 (Circus Day) ==
Elsie Neal presents circus miniatures. Purple Panda returns to the Neighborhood of Make-Believe, but misses the circus and the friends he has there. King Friday also tries to get the circus to the NOM.

- Aired on February 25, 1974.

== Episode 7 (Circus Day) ==
Sam Kamin, a balloon artist, visits the McFeelys to make animal balloons. In the Neighborhood of Make-Believe, Oliver Circus Clown reunites with Purple Panda.

- Aired on February 26, 1974.

== Episode 8 (Circus Day) ==
Mrs. McFeely is looking after a Capuchin monkey at her house. In the Neighborhood of Make-Believe, King Friday and Oliver Circus Clown reach a compromise by which Purple Panda can rejoin the circus.

- Aired on February 27, 1974.

== Episode 9 (Circus Day ) ==
Rogers sees the Shadow Box Theatre perform their puppets. Daniel is afraid of the circus parade passing his Clock.

- Aired on February 28, 1974.

== Episode 10 (Circus Day) ==
Ella Jenkins visits Rogers' television house to share songs and musical instruments. The Neighborhood of Make-Believe holds Circus Day. Purple Panda leaves to rejoin the circus.

- Aired on March 1, 1974.

== Episode 11 (The Missing Clock) ==
Rogers searches for his watch. In the Neighborhood of Make-Believe, Daniel works on his Clock, but it disappears.

- Aired on March 4, 1974.

== Episode 12 (The Missing Clock) ==
The Neighborhood of Make-Believe launches a search for Daniel's Clock.

- Aired on March 5, 1974.

== Episode 13 (The Missing Clock) ==
Mr. Allmine tries to take the sandbox where Prince Tuesday and Daniel are playing. While that is thwarted, he does lead them to the Land of Allmine, where Daniel's Clock stands.

- Aired on March 6, 1974.

== Episode 14 (The Missing Clock) ==
Mr. Allmine still refuses to return the Clock to Daniel, but Lady Elaine Fairchilde steps in with a wiry trick.

- Aired on March 7, 1974.

== Episode 15 (The Missing Clock) ==
Sam Senkow introduces the game of story tag to Rogers. Mr. Allmine returns Daniel's Clock.

- Aired on March 8, 1974.

== Episode 16 (McFeelys’ anniversary) ==
Mr. and Mrs. McFeely tell Rogers that their anniversary is four days away. In the Neighborhood of Make-Believe, Lady Elaine makes a cylinder record on which King Friday's ancestors can be heard.

- Aired on March 11, 1974.

== Episode 17 (McFeelys' anniversary) ==
Rogers' son John shows his molds of animal tracks. Elsie Neal is assigned to make a portrait of Mr. McFeely. King Friday asks for a statue of Monday IX, his "great-great-great-great grandfather".

- Aired on March 12, 1974.

== Episode 18 McFeelys' anniversary) ==
Audrey Roth wants to put a mirror in an old frame and present it as an anniversary gift for the McFeelys. In the Neighborhood of Make-Believe, Prince Tuesday sees himself, for the first time, in a mirror while touring the Museum-Go-Round.

- Aired on March 13, 1974.

== Episode 19 (McFeelys’ anniversary) ==
Rogers sees what Chef Brockett is making for the McFeelys' anniversary: a mother cat and her kitten. In the Neighborhood of Make-Believe, Elsie Neal and Henrietta contribute to the statue of King Monday.

- Aired on March 14, 1974.

== Episode 20 (McFeelys’ Anniversary) ==
Rogers and other neighbors attend a surprise party for the McFeelys' anniversary. The Neighborhood of Make-Believe witnesses the unveiling of the statue of King Monday.

- Aired on March 15, 1974.

== Episode 21 ( The Elves, the Shoemaker and the Shoemaker's Wife) ==
Rogers sees the Brown Marionette Company prepare for a performance of The Shoemaker and the Elves. In the Neighborhood of Make-Believe, a self-billed Master Mister Magic Maker insists on performing magic tricks. To some, he is a mischief maker.

- Aired on March 18, 1974.

== Episode 22 ( The Elves, the Shoemaker and the Shoemaker's Wife) ==
Rogers offers to write music for the Brown Marionettes' production of The Elves, The Shoemaker and the Shoemaker's Wife. In the Neighborhood of Make-Believe, Prince Tuesday breaks the statue of King Monday. Lady Elaine is among the neighbors who first let the Prince understand what he has done and then help him repair it.

- Aired on March 19, 1974.

== Episode 23 ( The Elves, the Shoemaker and the Shoemaker's Wife) ==
Chef Brockett has a sale on round baked goods. X needs Handyman Negri to help repair the bell outside Henrietta's house.

- Aired on March 20, 1974.

== Episode 24 ( The Elves, the Shoemaker and the Shoemaker's Wife) ==
Rogers delivers his songs to the Brown Marionettes Theater in preparation for the puppet play the next day. In the Neighborhood of Make-Believe, X looks for a hide-and-find lesson from the Owl Correspondence School.

- Aired on March 21, 1974.

== Episode 25 ( The Elves, the Shoemaker and the Shoemaker's Wife) ==
The Brown Marionettes perform The Elves, the Shoemaker and the Shoemaker's Wife.

- Aired on March 22, 1974.

== Episode 26 (Water Flowing and Stopping) ==
Rogers shows a film of his visit to New York to see François Clemmons. Later Rogers visits an oboist at Negri's Music shop. Some in the Neighborhood of Make-Believe look for X's OCS lesson. King Friday shows concern that his waterfall remain off most of the time.

- Aired on March 25, 1974.

== Episode 27 (Water Flowing and Stopping) ==
Audrey Roth's daughter Holly shows some of her crafts at Rogers' television house. Later Rogers hears a Vietnamese musician at François Clemmons' studio. The Neighborhood of Make-Believe also becomes the perfect place for a magic switch to turn the Castle fountain on or off.

- Aired on March 26, 1974.

== Episode 28 (Water Flowing and Stopping) ==
Rogers talks of turning things on and off, such as a flashlight and a water faucet. Later he goes to Elsie Neal's Craft Shop where two people are making a papier-mâché tunnel. The Neighborhood of Make-Believe witnesses a fire at Henrietta's house. Prince Tuesday lets Handyman Negri use his squirt bottle to put it out.

- Aired on March 27, 1974.

== Episode 29 (Water Flowing and Stopping) ==
Julia Child makes spaghetti Marco Polo at Brockett's Bakery. Smokey Bear visits the Neighborhood of Make-Believe to console Henrietta.

- Aired on March 28, 1974.
- This is the first episode to have Smokey Bear in this episode of the series.

== Episode 30 (The History of Planet Purple) ==
Mike Taylor, a bass player, performs at Negri's Music Shop. Rogers begins reading The History of Planet Purple. Handyman Negri and others in the Neighborhood of Make-Believe are surprised to see people from the Planet Purple wearing different colors.

- Aired on March 29, 1974.

== Episode 31 (The History of Planet Purple) ==
Rogers continues to read from The History of Planet Purple, explaining that Lady Elaine's visit opened the populace to variety in life. In the Neighborhood of Make-Believe, Paul and Pauline arrive looking for Purple Panda.

- Aired on April 1, 1974.

== Episode 32 (The History of Planet Purple) ==
Rogers reads The Owl and the Pussycat. In the Neighborhood of Make-Believe, Lady Aberlin is surprised to see Paul and Pauline with variety in their lives.

- Aired on April 2, 1974.

== Episode 33 (The History of Planet Purple) ==
Myra Stone, a silversmith, displays her jewelry at Elsie Neal's Craft Shop. In the Neighborhood of Make-Believe, Lady Elaine is not pleased with the changes at Planet Purple until she discovers those changes came about from her.

- Aired on April 3, 1974.

== Episode 34 (The History of Planet Purple) ==
Rogers discusses voting and sees a voting machine at Trow's Workshop. Most in the Neighborhood of Make-Believe oppose the vote to add "Fairchilde" at the end of the territory's name.

- Aired on April 4, 1974.

== Episode 35 (The History of Planet Purple) ==
Chef Brockett and Barbara Russell apply clown make-up at Betty's Little Theater. Rogers completes his reading of The History of Planet Purple. Lady Elaine whisks herself and a panda from the circus for a weekend on Planet Purple.

- Aired on April 5, 1974.

== Episode 36 (Harvest Festival) ==
Chef Brockett makes waffles at the McFeelys' house. In the Neighborhood of Make-Believe, he begins searching for maple syrup. Lady Elaine promises she will make syrup by Thursday.

- Aired on April 8, 1974.

== Episode 37 (Harvest Festival) ==
In the television house, Rogers gets a hole in a bucket repaired. In the Neighborhood of Make-Believe, Lady Elaine wants to go into making maple syrup.

- Aired on April 9, 1974.

== Episode 38 (Harvest Festival) ==
Rogers witnesses actor Iron Eyes Cody and a Native American family teaching dances to François Clemmons. In the Neighborhood of Make-Believe, Lady Elaine plans to get maple syrup for the harvest festival. To start it, she tries to tap X's oak tree.

- Aired on April 10, 1974.

== Episode 39 (Harvest Festival) ==
After Lady Elaine Fairchilde fails to get maple syrup from X's oak tree, Chef Brockett helps her remember the brown sugar syrup she enjoyed as a child.

- Aired on April 11, 1974.

== Episode 40 (Harvest Festival) ==
Elsie Neal helps Rogers arrange a rock garden at her craft shop. In the Neighborhood of Make-Believe, Lady Elaine gets her bottles of brown sugar syrup ready for the Potato Harvest Festival at Someplace Else.

- Aired on April 12, 1974.

== Episode 41 (All in the Laundry) ==
Rogers' adopted sister visits with her two sons. In the Neighborhood of Make-Believe, Lady Elaine discusses opera roles with John Reardon.

- Aired on April 15, 1974.

== Episode 42 (All in the Laundry) ==
Rogers hears Don Riggs play a washboard at Negri's Music Shop. He also visits the McFeelys' house to see an old-fashioned washing machine. In the Neighborhood of Make-Believe, X suggests a role he can play in the opera.

- Aired on April 16, 1974.

== Episode 43 (All in the Laundry) ==
François Clemmons demonstrates his camera to Rogers. In the Neighborhood of Make-Believe, Clemmons asks to be a photographer in the opera.

- Aired on April 17, 1974.

== Episode 44 (All in the Laundry) ==
Rogers puts a puzzle together and sees how diamonds are cut. In the Neighborhood of Make-Believe, King Friday grants Yoshi Ito a part in the upcoming opera.

- Aired on April 18, 1974.

== Episode 45 (All in the Laundry) ==
The Neighborhood of Make-Believe stages the opera All in the Laundry. In it, Reardon plays a lowly laundromat worker who catches the eye of a handsome lady.

- Aired on April 19, 1974.
- This is the first episode to feature Mr. McFeely's first Speedy Delivery song, which is titled as "That's what you'll get".

== Episode 46 (Deaf Culture) ==
Tim Scanlon and Elaine Bromka, from the National Theatre of the Deaf, perform a pantomime of Mary Had a Little Lamb. X gets word that a new professor at Owl Correspondence School will teach him a new lesson soon.

- Aired on April 22, 1974.

== Episode 47 (Deaf Culture) ==
The National Theatre for the Deaf performs pantomime at Betty's Little Theater. Henrietta and King Friday express their feelings for X's new teacher.

- Aired on April 23, 1974.

== Episode 48 (Deaf Culture) ==
Rogers dyes some Easter eggs. In the Neighborhood of Make-Believe, X prints all sorts of signs after Professor Scanlon's lessons.

- Aired on April 24, 1974.

== Episode 49 (Deaf Culture) ==
Rogers discusses facial expressions vibrations with musical instruments. In the Neighborhood of Make-Believe, King Friday decides he likes X the Owl's teacher.

- Aired on April 25, 1974.

== Episode 50 (Deaf Culture) ==
Tim Scanlon is at Bob Trow's workshop enlarging photographs. In the Neighborhood of Make-Believe, King Friday wishes to hold a dinner for Professor Scanlon.

- Aired on April 26, 1974.

== Episode 51 (The Wedding of Lady Elaine?) ==
Mr. McFeely gives Rogers a pullover shirt from Elsie Neal. Later Rogers hears a marimba and a xylophone at Negri's Music Shop.

- Aired on April 29, 1974.

== Episode 52 (The Wedding of Lady Elaine?) ==
Since Corny said Lady Elaine is his best neighbor, she gives him freshly squeezed orange juice. In his appreciation, Corny gives Lady Elaine a baseball bat. This, she thinks, is a sign that she and Corny are engaged.

- Aired on April 30, 1974.

== Episode 53 (The Wedding of Lady Elaine?) ==
John Costa performs his accordion at François Clemmons' studio. In the Neighborhood of Make-Believe, Lady Elaine decides she will marry Corny the following Wednesday. Lady Aberlin feels Corny knows nothing about the engagement.

- Aired on May 1, 1974.

== Episode 54 (The Wedding of Lady Elaine?) ==
Rogers meets a weaver at Elsie Neal's Craft Shop. In the Neighborhood of Make-Believe, Elsie Jean and Miss Paulifficate plan for Lady Elaine's shower.

- Aired on May 2, 1974.

== Episode 55 (The Wedding of Lady Elaine?) ==
Rogers works a sandsifter and says that only water flows through a bathroom shower. The Neighborhood of Make-Believe holds its shower for Lady Elaine.

- Aired on May 3, 1974.

== Episode 56 (The Wedding of Lady Elaine?) ==
Rogers goes to the McFeelys to work a player piano, even though Mrs. Mcfeely had not been told about it. In the Neighborhood of Make-Believe, Lady Elaine thinks Joey Hollingsworth will be the best man for her apparent wedding with Corny.

- Aired on May 6, 1974.

== Episode 57 (The Wedding of Lady Elaine?) ==
Professor Arne B. Larson shows a few ancient musical instruments at Negri's Music Shop. In the Neighborhood of Make-Believe, Corny leaves on a business trip, ruining Lady Elaine's thoughts of a wedding between them.

- Aired on May 7, 1974.

== Episode 58 (The Wedding of Lady Elaine?) ==
Back in Negri's Music Shop, Arne B. Larson demonstrates handmade musical instruments. Those in the Neighborhood of Make-Believe try to get a dour Lady Elaine to attend a party.

- Aired on May 8, 1974.

== Episode 59 (MGR-TV is On The Air) ==
Rogers shows all the puppets he uses in the Neighborhood segments. He and Bob Trow (the man behind Harriet Elizabeth Cow) demonstrate the washer-dryer-sorter-dumper. In the Neighborhood of Make-Believe, Lady Elaine overcomes her disappointment of the day before by starting a television station, called MGR-TV.

- Aired on May 9, 1974.

== Episode 60 (MGR-TV is On The Air) ==
Rogers shows how a bed tray is used. Lady Elaine Fairchilde puts on cooking shows at MGR-TV. But the station is strapped into inaction because Lady Elaine doesn't have a TV license.

- Aired on May 10, 1974.

== Episode 61 (Puppets and Feelings) ==
Rogers first shows his driver's license. As a favor for Mr. McFeely, he gives a delivery to Trow's workshop. Robert Trow is giving a lesson on silkscreening to a professional artist. The Neighborhood of Make-Believe has waited a weekend for the license for MGR-TV. A few hurdles still have to be cleared. X and Mr. McFeely have delivered to an empty studio. But Lady Elaine and King Friday arrive in haste, eager to get MGR-TV back on the air.

- Aired on May 13, 1974.

== Episode 62 (Puppets and Feelings) ==
Negri's Music Shop has a display of television equipment. Rogers and Negri take turns working the camera and performing music on-screen. Before leaving the shop, Rogers encounters Terri and Chrissy Thompson, who are arranging a puppet show. MGR-TV still continues to emerge at the Neighborhood of Make-Believe, creating program ideas on the spot. To help tiring camera operator, Lady Aberlin, Handyman Negri provides a rolling camera attachment.

- Aired on May 14, 1974.

== Episode 63 (Puppets and Feelings) ==
Mister Rogers brings with him a collection of puppets from around the world that were provided by the Lovelace Marionette Theatre. He then goes to Elsie Neal's shop to find Elsie Neal helping Terri and Chrissy Thompson for their upcoming puppet show. In the Neighborhood of Make-Believe, Lady Elaine is ready to do remote TV work. The first act is Lady Aberlin in a primitive witch costume, which scares Henrietta.

- Aired on May 15, 1974.

== Episode 64 (Puppets and Feelings) ==
Chrissy Thompson tells a story of how a girl had despised her braces and crutches, but changed her mind thanks to Chrissy's television visits. X and Lady Aberlin help to comfort Henrietta Pussycat by telling her in song, Witches Aren't Real.

- Aired on May 16, 1974.

== Episode 65 (Puppets and Feelings) ==
In preparation for Chrissy and Terri's puppet show, Mister Rogers has made an "icebox cake" from chocolate wafers and whipped cream. Before the play, the Neighborhood of Make-Believe finds Lady Aberlin in search of the world's smallest talking witch.

- Aired on May 17, 1974.
