= Edmund H. Baggs =

South Australian art teacher and painter

Edmund Henry Baggs (1865 – 6 July 1949) was a South Australian art teacher and painter, mostly of landscapes in oils, c. 1890–1920.

Baggs conducted painting lessons in watercolours and oils, also Poonah (Note: A technique involving application of opaque color on thin paper, used especially for painting flowers, reminiscent of Oriental decorative work) and Electric Painting (Note: Possibly a synonym for airbrush art) at his studio on Finniss Street, North Adelaide in 1894, later on Kensington Road, Norwood.

In the South Australian Society of Arts Annual Report of 1902–1903 his address was listed as 75, Parade, Norwood, then from 1904–1907, his address was the Studio, 84 Royal Exchange. From 1908-1910, he was at Rundle Street east. He was a Fellow of the SASA from 1904 to 1910, after which his name does not appear in their Annual Reports.

He sold many of his paintings on the art union principle; a kind of raffle where the artist is the beneficiary and art works are the prizes.

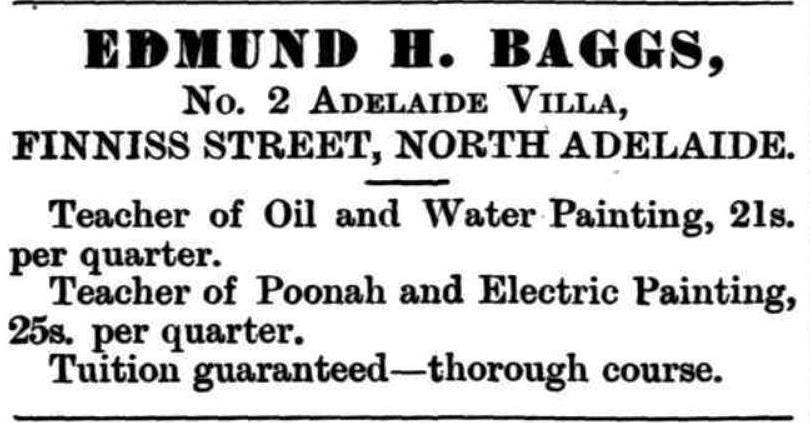
Advertisement, 1910

== Family ==
Baggs married Maye Rosetta Grose (1875–1968) in 1897. Their children included:

- Lucretia Anneta May "Reta" Baggs (1897–1966) married George Charles Bradford in 1927
- Harrold Edmund Roy Baggs (1898–1970)
- Eric Luke Baggs (1900–1974) married Gertrude ?? in 1930
- Reginald Edmund "Reg" Baggs (1902–1979)
- Vivian Vernon "Viv" Baggs (1905–1992)

They lived in Pulteney Street around 1896, then at Norwood, finally Towitta, South Australia.

== Paintings ==
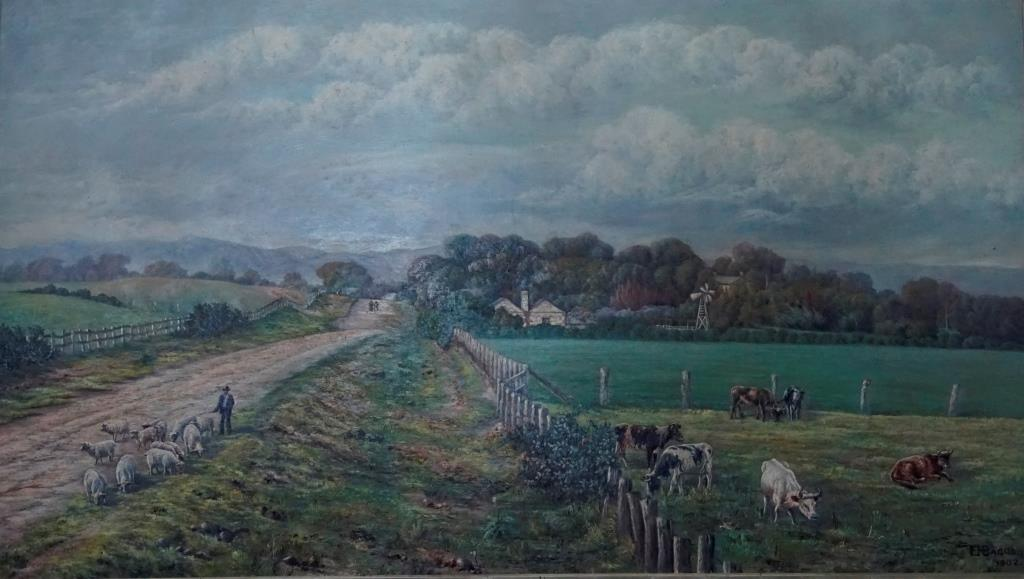
Grange Road, Adelaide 1902

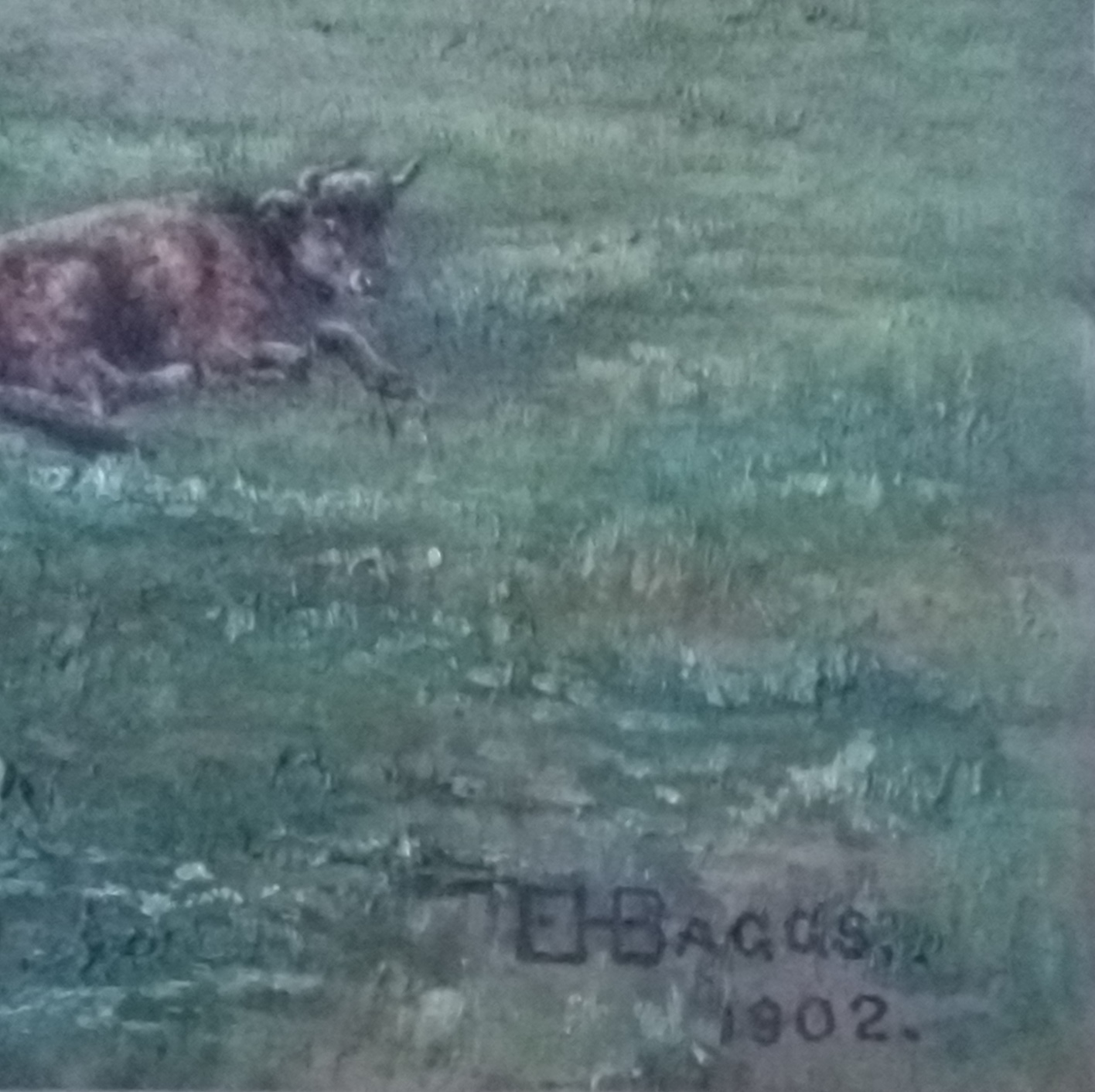
Detail Grange Road (1902) by E. H. Baggs

He exhibited twice with the South Australian Society of Arts:

- Clough Pond, Onkaparinga, S.A. (item no. 145a in the SASA 1902 Annual Exhibition) for sale at £30.
- Turn of the Tide, Hallett’s Cove, S.A. (item no. 103 in the SASA 1910 Annual Exhibition), £110.

Recent sales:

- Evening Shadows (after H. J. Johnstone's original held by the Art Gallery of South Australia)
- Amongst the Breakers
- Australian Bush Scene (dated 1923)
- Yachts off the Coast (signed 'Edmund H. Baggs')
- Coastal Scene (signed 'Edmund H. Baggs)
- Near Montacute Adelaide Hills (signed 'E. H. Baggs', dated 1911)
- As the Road Winds Around Montacute (dated 1911)
- Coastal Landscape
- View of Adelaide from the Adelaide Foothills (signed 'E. H. Baggs', dated 1911)
- Australian River Landscape (signed 'Edmund H. Baggs')

On public view

- Grange Road, Adelaide (signed E H Baggs, dated 1902), held at Monte Cristo Homestead, Junee, New South Wales
