= Mister Rogers' Neighborhood season 3 =

Mister Rogers' Neighborhood
- Season 3
- No. of episodes: 65

Release
- Original network: PBS

Season chronology
- ← Previous; Season 2 Next → Season 4

The following is a list of episodes from the third season of the PBS series, Mister Rogers' Neighborhood, which aired in 1970. The first broadcast of Mister Rogers' Neighborhood was on the National Educational Television network on February 19, 1968. It was the last season to air on NET before it was rebranded to PBS on October 5, 1970.

== Episode 1 (The NOM Models) ==
Rogers enters the Television House with a model of Daniel's clock and visits the man who designed it who is Robert Trow. At his workshop, Trow is finishing a model of the Castle. He asks Rogers to ring the bell when he leaves as well as when he arrives.

- Aired on February 2, 1970.

== Episode 2 (The NOM Models) ==
Rogers shows some slides of trees. Mr. McFeely delivers Bob Trow's model of X's Tree. In the Neighborhood of Make-Believe, X learns that wishing doesn't make things come true.

- Aired on February 3, 1970.

== Episode 3 (The NOM Models) ==
Rogers puts signs outside his front and back doors advising visitors to knock or ring. He also receives Bob Trow's model of the Museum-Go-Round.

- Aired on February 4, 1970.

== Episode 4 (The NOM Models) ==
Rogers brings in Bob Trow's model of the Platypus Mound. Officer Clemmons shows Rogers the workings at his police station. Dr. Bill and Elsie Jean Platypus also share a magic recipe for making pies.

The debut of the song "It's Such A Good Feeling"

- Aired on February 5, 1970.

== Episode 5 (The NOM Models) ==
Rogers receives the Factory model from Robert Trow. Beforehand, Rogers makes simple puppets from wooden spoons. In the Neighborhood of Make-Believe, Lady Elaine orders chairs from Cornflake in preparation for her new pie restaurant.

- Aired on February 6, 1970.

== Episode 6 (The Pie Restaurant) ==
Rogers plays a game that uses different shapes and groceries. In the Neighborhood of Make-Believe, Lady Elaine Fairchilde is preparing to open a pie restaurant between her Museum-Go-Round and the Platypus mound.

- Aired on February 9, 1970.

== Episode 7 (The Pie Restaurant) ==
Mr. McFeely finds a puppy, which Rogers looks after until someone finds its home.

- Aired on February 10, 1970.

== Episode 8 (The Pie Restaurant) ==
Chef Brockett shows how turnovers are made and helps run the new pie restaurant.

- Aired on February 11, 1970.

== Episode 9 (The Pie Restaurant) ==
Bad manners cost Bob Dog after he eats all the pies in Lady Elaine's restaurant.

- Aired on February 12, 1970.

== Episode 10 (The Pie Restaurant) ==
Dr. Yen Wang shows two laboratory rats, with which he wishes to show that the study of rats is intended to benefit human beings. The Neighborhood of Make-Believe opens the pie restaurant, but King Friday orders Bob Dog to move it to Someplace Else as a response to what he did in episode 9.

- Aired on February 13, 1970.

== Episode 11 ==
Rogers polishes his shoes. The Pittsburgh Junior Tamburitzans also visit the Neighborhood of Make-Believe, and Bob Dog emerges to dance with them.

- Aired on February 16, 1970.

== Episode 12 ==
Rogers discusses the things children can do with a shoe box. In the Neighborhood of Make-Believe, Queen Sara is escorted to Westwood to visit Dr. Frogg.

- Aired on February 17, 1970.

== Episode 13 ==
Johnny Costa and his grandson visit both Rogers' television house and the Neighborhood of Make-Believe.

- Aired on February 18, 1970.

== Episode 14 ==
Rogers discusses growing both on the inside and on the outside. Mr. McFeely brings a dry aquarium holding frogs and tadpoles. Later Mr. McFeely visits the Westwood Children's Zoo. Queen Sara returns to the Neighborhood of Make-Believe from Westwood after two days with Dr. Frogg.

- Aired on February 19, 1970.

== Episode 15 (The NOM Models) ==
Rogers talks about the use of triangles, such as on the Yield sign. Betty Aberlin arrives with Bob Trow's model of the Eiffel Tower.

- Aired on February 20, 1970.

== Episode 16 ==
Henrietta Pussycat fears Bob Dog's teeth. Lady Aberlin confides in Henrietta and tells everyone the King Friday and Queen Sara have a good secret.

- Aired on February 23, 1970.

== Episode 17 ==
Bramble, a large horse, stands outside Rogers' television house. King Friday asks for, and receives, a stuffed horse. Daniel, however, is afraid of the model.

- Aired on February 24, 1970.

== Episode 18 ==
Rogers enters with a typewriter and the many ways to put the word "typewriter" to paper. In the Neighborhood of Make-Believe, an artist draws paintings of King Friday and Queen Sara.

- Aired on February 25, 1970.

== Episode 19 ==
King Friday shares his secret with Mime Walker, informing him not to mention a word of it to anyone else.

- Aired on February 26, 1970.

== Episode 20 ==
Rogers has a recent chest x-ray, and explains what having an x-ray taken is about. In the Neighborhood of Make-Believe, Lady Elaine warns her neighbors that King Friday might be starting a wild animal zoo. That, she feels, is his big secret, although it isn't.

- Aired on February 27, 1970.

== Episode 21 (The Clemmonses are Moving) ==
Officer Clemmons announces he has accepted a new job with the Metropolitan Opera in New York City. King Friday and Queen Sara announce their secret: they are having a baby.

- Aired on March 2, 1970.

== Episode 22 (The Clemmonses are Moving) ==
Lady Elaine and Mrs. Saunders tie up Officer Clemmons in a frantic attempt to keep him from moving to New York.

- Aired on March 3, 1970.

== Episode 23 (The Clemmonses are Moving) ==
Betty Aberlin gives Rogers a black angel fish for his tank. In the Neighborhood of Make-Believe, she dresses up as one. At the Tree, she introduces a song praising Henrietta Pussycat.

- Aired on March 4, 1970.

== Episode 24 (The Clemmonses are Moving) ==
Mrs. Clemmons visits Rogers' television house with a poem about her new job title. Rogers invites her to a going-away party to be held the next day. A highlight of the gathering will be Mrs. Clemmons' favorite: raspberry delight.

- Aired on March 5, 1970.

== Episode 25 (The Clemmonses are Moving) ==
Mr. and Mrs. François Clemmons are about to leave for New York. In both the Neighborhood of Make-Believe and Rogers' television house, neighbors hold a farewell party.

- Aired on March 6, 1970.

== Episode 26 ==
Rogers shows models of a bicycle and a tricycle. Along the way, he introduces the prefixes "bi" and "tri" to compare what each one means. In the Neighborhood of Make-Believe, Bob Dog fears moving wheels.

- Aired on March 9, 1970.

== Episode 27 ==
Rogers uses a tape recorder to tape the sounds of a xylophone, a drum, and a slide whistle. In the Neighborhood of Make-Believe, King Friday thinks his baby should learn the guitar from birth.

- Aired on March 10, 1970.

== Episode 28 ==
Rogers shows how he reacts when he is angry. In the Neighborhood of Make-Believe, Lady Aberlin makes a punching bag from rags and knitting. X complements her work.

- Aired on March 11, 1970.

== Episode 29 ==
When Coach Saunders informs how athletic and exercise equipment can protect oneself, King Friday orders all the equipment for the new royal baby.

- Aired on March 12, 1970.

== Episode 30 ==
Rogers makes a window out of construction paper. Later he picks up a record album at Negri's Music Shop. In between, Chef Brockett goes to the Neighborhood of Make-Believe with a cake for Grand-père and Lady Elaine. Handyman Negri helps Lady Elaine fix the King Friday's broken window.

- Aired on March 13, 1970.

== Episode 31 ==
Mr. McFeely delivers Lady Elaine an invitation to a boomerang contest. To show her gratitude, Lady Elaine shows "Funny Fast Films" of Mr. McFeely and Chef Brockett.

- Aired on March 16, 1970.

== Episode 32 ==
Rogers plays rhyming games and flash cards with Bob Trow. Lady Elaine and several others participate in the boomerang contest.

- Aired on March 17, 1970.

== Episode 33 ==
Rogers shows different sizes of eggs and the animals who lay them. Elsie Jean Platypus says her newly-laid egg will hatch in ten days.

- Aired on March 18, 1970.

== Episode 34 ==
King Friday hears about the baby platypus that will emerge soon. He tries to make the Platypus family leave the Neighborhood of Make-Believe so that his new baby will be the first born there.

- Aired on March 19, 1970.

== Episode 35 ==
Dr. Bill Platypus and Digger Digorum convince King Friday that he will have the first human baby born in the Neighborhood of Make-Believe. Reminded, King Friday allows the Platypus family to stay. They will have the first animal baby born there.

- Aired on March 20, 1970.

== Episode 36 (Death of a Goldfish) ==
A fish in Rogers' tank has died. Rogers buries it and, with Bob Trow's help, constructs a tombstone with a pentagon that bears a fish drawing. In the Neighborhood of Make-Believe, concern hits when the Trolley stops at the Castle and doesn't move. Eventually, with help from Bill Platypus, they find out that the Trolley simply suffered a derailment, preventing full electrical pickup (as explained earlier by Mister Rogers).

- Aired on March 23, 1970.

== Episode 37 ==
At the grave of the fish he had buried, Rogers talks of sad feelings. At Negri's Music Shop, he witnesses the Pittsburgh Junior Tamburitzans play. In the Neighborhood of Make-Believe, the Platypus family waits for their egg to hatch.

- Aired on March 24, 1970.

== Episode 38 ==
Lady Aberlin finds everybody, except Lady Elaine, is at the Platypus Mound, waiting for the egg to hatch.

- Aired on March 25, 1970.

== Episode 39 (Birth of Ana Platypus) ==
Rogers demonstrates the use of a cane and shows many ways to write his name. The Neighborhood of Make-Believe celebrates the birth of Dr. Bill and Elsie Jean's baby girl platypus, Ana.

- Aired on March 26, 1970.

== Episode 40 ==
Handyman Negri is among those with a gift for the baby Platypus. It's a song to fit her Latin name, Ornithorhynchus anatinus.

- Aired on March 27, 1970.

== Episode 41 (The NOM Models) ==
Bob Trow has made his own model of the Neighborhood Trolley and its tracks for Rogers. In the Neighborhood of Make-Believe, King Friday is tired of waiting for the baby to be born. Several neighbors decide to hold a play based on what King Friday puts in a suitcase.

- Aired on March 30, 1970.

== Episode 42 ==
Rogers makes a cardboard suitcase, while in the Neighborhood of Make-Believe, Mr. Anybody finds his apparently empty suitcase has a heavy rock in it. Lady Elaine had to have put the rock inside.

- Aired on March 31, 1970.

== Episode 43 ==
Rogers goes to Negri's Music Shop to see Betty Aberlin perform a few simple magic tricks. Lady Elaine has her reservations about the upcoming play the Neighborhood of Make-Believe will stage. Mr. Anybody tells her she can be in the play if she asks to.

- Aired on April 1, 1970.

== Episode 44 ==
Rogers brings two gerbils to his television house. On a visit to the McFeelys' house, he finds Mr. McFeely looking after a Saint Bernard. In the Neighborhood of Make-Believe, Bob Dog is practicing for his role in the play "Let the Vet Get the Pet", but it isn't easy.

- Aired on April 2, 1970.

== Episode 45 ==
Rogers looks after two penguins for Mr. McFeely. The Neighborhood of Make-Believe holds its stage play, which is about a vet flying in a jet to check on a pet.

- Aired on April 3, 1970.

== Episode 46 ==
Robert Troll visits to see Ana Platypus, as do X and Henrietta.

- Aired on April 6, 1970.

== Episode 47 ==
Dr. Bill Platypus talks about time to X and Henrietta, who have discovered the newborn platypus is too small to play with them.

- Aired on April 7, 1970.

== Episode 48 ==
Mr. McFeely delivers a fortune teller's costume, which Mr. Anybody wears to predict the future.

- Aired on April 8, 1970.

== Episode 49 ==
Rogers welcomes Mrs. Franks, who demonstrates how to carve leather. Later he discusses wearing an eye patch. In the Neighborhood of Make-Believe, Handyman Negri assures King Friday that his eye is underneath an eye patch.

- Aired on April 9, 1970.

== Episode 50 ==
Rogers shows the dog that belongs to his son John. At Bob Trow's workshop, Rogers finds Trow and John working on fingerpaint pictures. Handyman Negri and Lady Aberlin have a message for Bob Dog.

- Aired on April 10, 1970.

== Episode 51 ==
Gifts have been pouring in for the imminent birth of Queen Sara's baby. One of them is a paper crown, which Henrietta takes without asking.

- Aired on April 13, 1970.

== Episode 52 (Birth of Prince Tuesday) ==
Rogers talks of being able to do certain skills at certain ages. Meanwhile, the Neighborhood of Make-Believe is abuzz with excitement, as Queen Sara gives birth to a prince named Tuesday.

- Aired on April 14, 1970.

== Episode 53 ==
The gifts keep pouring in for the newborn Prince Tuesday, which makes Lady Elaine jealous. Joey Hollingsworth arrives with gifts for the baby and other neighbors.

- Aired on April 15, 1970.

== Episode 54 ==
A watch repairman shows Rogers the proper use of his watch-cleaning machine. In the Neighborhood of Make-Believe, Nurse Miller tells all that Queen Sara and the newborn prince will begin to accept visitors next week.

- Aired on April 16, 1970.

== Episode 55 ==
Instead of the Neighborhood of Make-Believe, Rogers sees a story played out in Betty's Little Theater. Four dancers, dressed as raccoons, perform a nighttime adventure.

- Aired on April 17, 1970.

== Episode 56 ==
Lady Elaine is annoyed with Prince Tuesday's constant crying. At one point, she asks King Friday and Queen Sara to send the baby back, although they can't.

- Aired on April 20, 1970.

== Episode 57 ==
Prince Tuesday is one week old, and the Castle is suitably decorated for a celebration. King Friday gives gifts to everyone, which only rides Lady Elaine's jealousy.

- Aired on April 21, 1970.

== Episode 58 ==
Rogers shows how he operates Picture-Picture and the Trolley. In the Neighborhood of Make-Believe, King Friday asks that Reardon put together an opera within two days.

- Aired on April 22, 1970.

== Episode 59 ==
Reardon fears that he doesn't have enough time to write an opera for Friday, but he assembles the basics quickly.

- Aired on April 23, 1970.

== Episode 60 (Pineapples and Tomatoes) ==
The Neighborhood of Make-Believe holds its opera about the Pineapple Can Telephone Company.

- Aired on April 24, 1970.

== Episode 61 ==
Captain Kangaroo visits Rogers' television house and the Neighborhood of Make-Believe. He sees that Lady Elaine and Donkey Hodie are hopeful that the carrots would grow faster somehow.

- Aired on April 27, 1970.

== Episode 62 ==
Rogers visits Jan Zandhuis, a glassblower, who is doing a project for Mrs. Saunders. King Friday feels baby Prince Tuesday should be taught subtraction.

- Aired on April 28, 1970.

== Episode 63 ==
Rogers makes modeling clay, a perfect spot for son Jamie to discuss clay figurines. Dancer Ethel Winter is toured around the Neighborhood of Make-Believe and Someplace Else.

- Aired on April 29, 1970.

== Episode 64 ==
Rogers relates the lessons on teeth that he learned as a child.

- Aired on April 30, 1970.

== Episode 65 ==
Rogers and Chef Brockett play games in which one doesn't see, but hears or feels.

- Aired on May 1, 1970.
- This is the last series episode in which the show's title is spelled as "Misterogers' Neighborhood", and the second design of the neighborhood model, and the second design of the Mister Rogers television studio house, which consisted of yellow walls and brown wooden bottom panels. Starting in Season 4, the walls of the Mister Rogers television studio house were painted a brighter yellow, but more of a tan color, and the brown wooden bottom panels were removed from the wall. Parts of the kitchen set were also updated.
