= Raffle =

Gambling with numbered tickets, usually for charitable fundraising

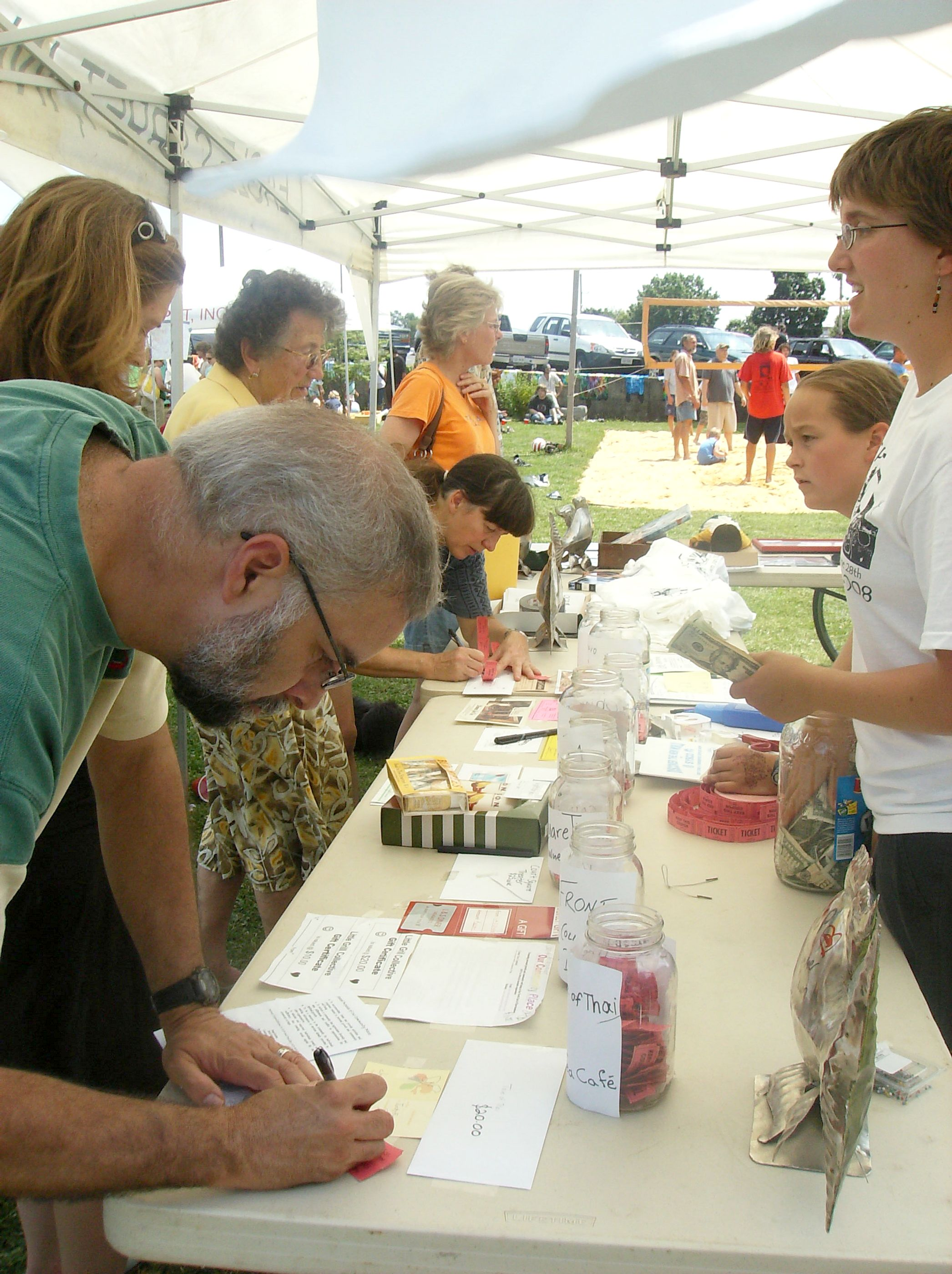
Customers buying restaurant raffle tickets at a 2008 event in Harrisonburg, Virginia

A strip of common two-part raffle tickets

A raffle is a gambling competition in which people obtain numbered tickets, each of which has an equal chance of winning a prize. At a set time, the winners are drawn at random from a container holding a copy of each number. The drawn tickets are checked against a collection of prizes with numbers attached to them, and the holder of the ticket wins the prize.

The raffle is a popular game in many countries, and is often held to raise funds for a specific charity or event.

== Process ==
A raffle may involve several separate prizes, possibly donated, with a different ticket drawn for each prize, so a purchaser of a ticket may not be attracted to a specific prize, but for the possibility of winning any of those offered. The draw for prizes may be held at a special event, with many onlookers and overseen by a club official or well-known person. In the prize draw, one ticket is drawn for the initial prize; that ticket is then left out of the container. A second ticket is then drawn for the next prize, and that ticket also is discarded, and so on. This continues until all prizes have been won.

=== Chinese auction ===
A common practice for increasing revenue from ticket sales is to offer bulk sales of tickets, e.g., $10 per single ticket or $25 for three tickets, although this practice is illegal in some countries. This practise is also known as Chinese auction. In some places (e.g. Australia) raffles are regulated and require a permit, or may only be legal for registered nonprofits. Players tend to spend more money on bulk tickets believing they have a much better chance of winning. Since the tickets cost little to produce, and the prize expense has been set, the number of tickets sold creates little or no additional cost for the raffle holders.

== Tombola ==
Tombola is a raffle mostly played at Christmas time. Prizes are often only of symbolic value. With the Italian mass emigration of the 19th and 20th centuries, the game which originated in Southern Italy was exported abroad and it took different forms and names such as Bingo.

== Private raffle ==
The process may be employed, where legal, to dispose of a high-value item such as a horse, car or real estate. One example was American-Australian photographer Townsend Duryea's raffling off his yacht Coquette in 1858.

Where the prize is a valuable work of art, the process may be termed an art union, particularly where the beneficiary is the originating artist. Australian artists who have disposed of their works in this way include Alfred Felton, James Ashton. and E. H. Baggs.

== Worldwide ==
In the UK, the term "tombola" is used when the raffle tickets are placed in a barrel and tumbled before the winning tickets are drawn from the barrel. The tombola booth is commonly used as a fundraising event for local fetes.

In New Zealand and Australia, meat raffles are commonplace in pubs and registered clubs. Trays of meat or seafood are raffled to raise money for a cause, often a local sporting club. Similar raffles are held in Minnesota, Wisconsin and Rhode Island.

== Cash raffle ==
In a cash raffle, the prize is a portion of the total earnings. These are sometimes referred to as "50/50" draws, with half of the money going to the raffle winner and half to organizers or a charity they are supporting, although the prize may not necessarily be equal to 50 percent of the earnings.

Such raffles are illegal in some places, such as California (with limited exceptions).

== See also ==
- Fundraising
- Lottery
- Sweepstakes
- Lucky dip
