= Vija Vētra =

Latvian dancer and choreographer (1923–2026)

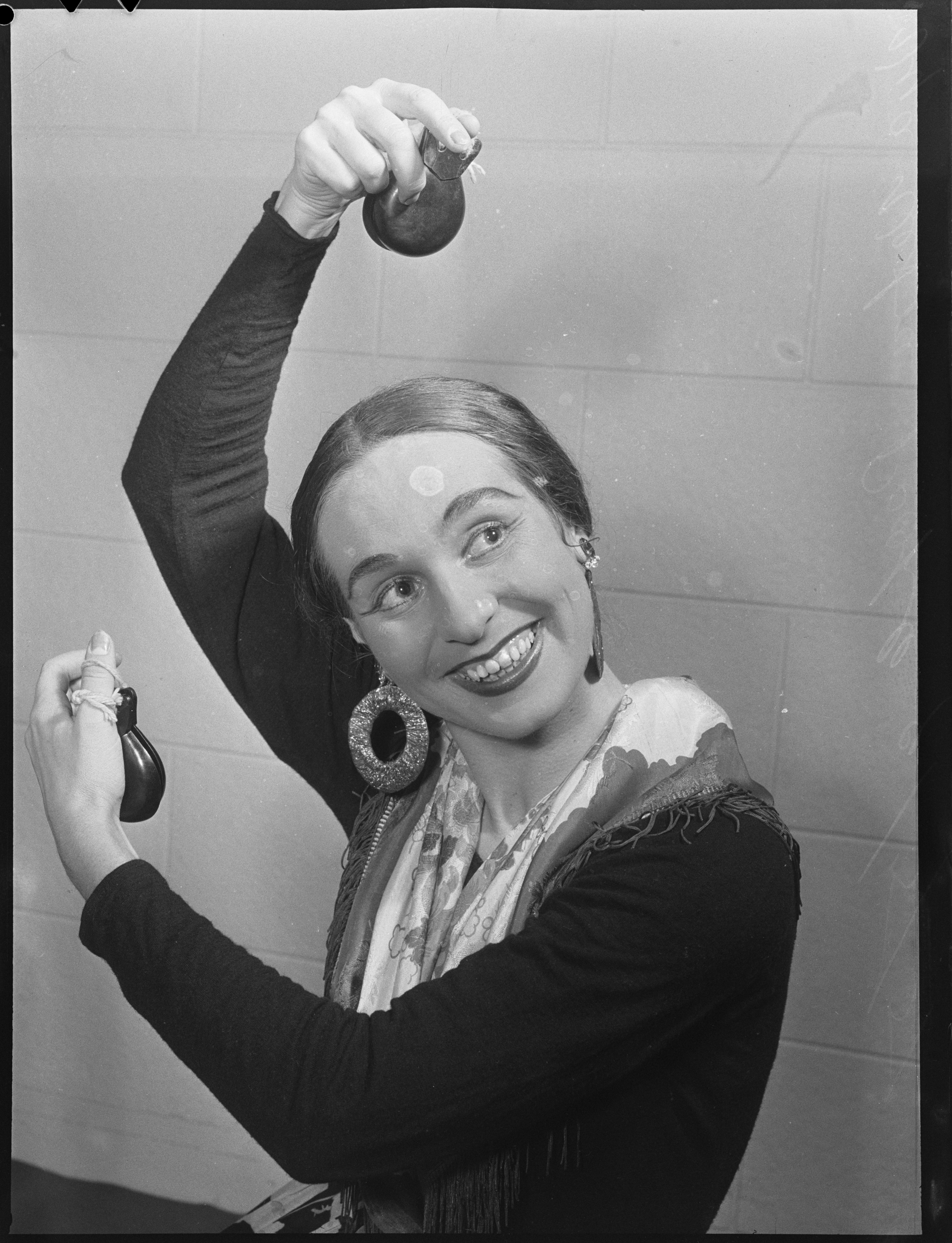
- Portrait of Vija Vētra, Sydney, 1951
- Born: 6 February 1923; Riga, Latvia
- Died: 11 April 2026 (aged 103)
- Education: University of Music and Performing Arts Vienna, Vienna Conservatory Ballet Chapter
- Occupations: Dancer, choreographer, dance studio owner and tutor
- Years active: 1940s-1990

Vija Vētra (6 February 1923 – 11 April 2026) was a Latvian dancer and choreographer who was a leading classical Indian dancer. She was based in the United States from 1964 until her death in 2026.

== Life and career ==
During World War II, she studied at the Vienna Academy of Music and Performing Arts, as well as at the Vienna Conservatory Ballet chapter.

In 1948, she immigrated to Australia, where in 1951 in Sydney she opened a dance studio. Then, she moved to West Germany. In 1967, she opened a dance study in New York City. She danced ballet performances but has mainly engaged in the Indian classical dances.

From 1966 to 1975, she appeared in fourteen episodes of Mister Rogers' Neighborhood.

From 1990, she visited Latvia each year to teach classes and perform in concerts.

In 1993, she founded the Unitarian Universalist church in Riga. She is the subject of a couple of documentaries: Vijaya (2004) and The World of Vija Vetra (2007).

Vētra died on 11 April 2026, at the age of 103.

== Honours ==
In 1999, Vētra received the Order of the Three Stars by the Latvian government.

Vētra turned 100 on 6 February 2023.
