= Mister Rogers' Neighborhood season 13 =

Mister Rogers' Neighborhood
- Season 13
- No. of episodes: 16

Release
- Original network: PBS

Season chronology
- ← Previous; Season 12 Next → Season 14

The following is a list of episodes from the 13th season of the PBS series, Mister Rogers' Neighborhood, which aired in late 1982 and early 1983. The first broadcast of Mister Rogers' Neighborhood was on the National Educational Television network on February 19, 1968.

== Episode 1 (Friends) ==
Rogers brings in a display of some of his friends. In the middle of the display is his longtime friend Buzz Wagner, from whom Rogers buys a pair of shoes. The Neighborhood of Make-Believe residents learn a few things about sharing.

- Aired on November 15, 1982.

== Episode 2 (Friends) ==
Mr. McFeely takes Rogers to Betty Aberlin's house for a sing-along with a few children. In the Neighborhood of Make-Believe, a turkey gives messages to Lady Elaine and Robert Troll. They are to bring banners and large balloons to the Neighborhood Picnic in two days' time.

- Aired on November 16, 1982.

== Episode 3 (Friends) ==
Mister Rogers sees the ins and outs of a restaurant. Among the notes distributed to Make-Believers are three parts toward making a fruit salad. This tests the teamwork of Lady Aberlin, X and Henrietta.

- Aired on November 17, 1982.

== Episode 4 (Friends) ==
Rogers visits Betty Aberlin's little theater for a performance of fife and drums. The Neighborhood of Make-Believe holds its picnic for friends—but Lady Aberlin forgets to take Daniel there.

- Aired on November 18, 1982.

== Episode 5 (Friends) ==
Robert Trow gives a demonstration of pulleys at his workshop. The Neighborhood of Make-Believe tells a separate story with a rainy outcome.

- Aired on November 19, 1982.

== Episode 6 (Games) ==
Rogers shows a video on how people make towels. In the Neighborhood of Make-Believe, a salesman informs King Friday of an upcoming letter from the Make-Believe Olympic Games Committee.

- Aired on February 7, 1983.

== Episode 7 (Games) ==
Bob Trow has made a rocking chair for Rogers to borrow for the day. Cornflake S. Pecially has two new chairs, with which Lady Aberlin and Bob Dog play a stop-and-go game. And Then Mr Rogers Views On A Video That Mr Rogers and Mrs Mcfeely Came To Weirton Wv

- Aired on February 8, 1983.

== Episode 8 (Games) ==
Rogers and Mr. McFeely go to a place where robots are assembled. One such robot measures off the Neighborhood of Make-Believe for the upcoming Olympic Games.

- Aired on February 9, 1983.

== Episode 9 (Games) ==
Rogers displays a chocolate ice cream bar that resembles the gorilla from the video game Donkey Kong. He takes a few bites, and explains that when he was a boy, and had something edible that looked like an animal or a person (e.g. animal crackers, chocolate bunnies, or an ice cream Santa Claus), he often didn't want to eat it. He thought that if he ate it, he might become, or incur the wrath of, the animal or person. He then explains that as he aged, he realized that "ice cream was ice cream...and cake was cake...no matter what shapes they were in". He obtained the ice cream bar from Brockett's Bakery, which is making and selling cakes designed to look like characters from the Neighborhood of Make-Believe. Chef Brockett has a couple of video arcade games to promote his cake sale. Rogers learns how to play Donkey Kong and sees how the controls work. In the Neighborhood of Make-Believe, X finds he is better at some of the planned Olympic Games than others. But the Olympic plans hit a wall when Lady Elaine Fairchilde makes snow fall.

- Aired on February 10, 1983.

== Episode 10 (Games) ==
Rogers shows a new board game some friends based on the Neighborhood of Make-Believe. Ella Jenkins shares some childhood stories and songs. In the Neighborhood of Make-Believe, the children collectively figure out a way to stop the snowfall and permit the Make-Believe Olympic Games to begin.

- Aired on February 11, 1983.

== Episode 11 (Mister Rogers Talks to Parents About Daycare) ==
Previewing the next set of programs, Rogers discusses with parents about daycare.

- Aired on April 24, 1983.

== Episode 12 (Daycare and Nightcare) ==
Mister Rogers follows Mr. McFeely as he delivers snacks to a daycare center, where Rogers gets a quick tour of the inside of it. King Friday and Queen Sara have been invited to another neighborhood to lecture together on crown-keeping and child-rearing.

- Aired on April 25, 1983.

== Episode 13 (Daycare and Nightcare) ==
Rogers brings an array of zippered goods to his television house, and shows a video on how zippers are made. In the Neighborhood of Make-Believe, Prince Tuesday says goodbye to his parents as his night-and-day care giver arrives.

- Aired on April 26, 1983.

== Episode 14 (Daycare and Nightcare) ==
Chuck Aber and Prince Tuesday observe the balloon room in the Museum-Go-Round. Handyman Negri assures Prince Tuesday that King Friday and Queen Sara are coming back.Mr Rogers Shows A Film On How People Make Dance Shirts

- Aired on April 27, 1983.

== Episode 15 (Daycare and Nightcare) ==
A friend gives Mr. Rogers pointers on how to take care of fish. Nighttime at the Neighborhood of Make-Believe finds Prince Tuesday recovering from a bad dream.

- Aired on April 28, 1983.

== Episode 16 (Daycare and Nightcare) ==
Rogers visits a bakery plant where graham crackers are made. The Neighborhood of Make-Believe welcomes back King Friday and Queen Sara. Just Mr Rogers Shows A Videotape About Big Bird Hugging Oscar The Grouch

- Aired on April 29, 1983.
