= Mister Rogers' Neighborhood season 31 =

Mister Rogers' Neighborhood
- Season 31
- No. of episodes: 5

Release
- Original network: PBS

Season chronology
- ← Previous; Season 30

The following is a list of episodes from the 31st and final season of the PBS series Mister Rogers' Neighborhood, that aired in 2001. This season was the shortest of the entire run, with only five episodes. The first broadcast of Mister Rogers' Neighborhood was on the National Educational Television network on February 19, 1968.

== Episode 1 (Celebrate the Arts) ==
While tree-sitting for Mr. McFeely, Rogers draws a picture of a tiny oak tree. McFeely compliments the drawing, and later, he shows a video on how adult tricycles are made. Cousin Mary returns to the Neighborhood of Make-Believe to show her videotape of various trees.

- Aired on August 27, 2001.
- This was X the Owl, Henrietta Pussycat, Cousin Mary Owl, and Prince Tuesday's last appearance in the series.

== Episode 2 (Celebrate the Arts) ==
Rogers takes his final visit to his sand table, leading to a video insert of Jessica Ricciardelli playing with sand at a beach. Afterward, Rogers makes his second and final trip to Tony Chiroldes' toy-and-book store. King Friday pronounces the Neighborhood of Make-Believe will hold an art festival. That doesn't impress Lady Elaine, who appoints herself the art judge.

- Aired on August 28, 2001.
- This was Grandpere and Queen Sara Saturday's last appearance in the series.

== Episode 3 (Celebrate the Arts) ==
The Neighborhood of Make-Believe sees Chuck Aber and HulaMouse's finished sand sculpture. Lady Elaine quickly criticizes it and just about everything else. But the sand sculpture inspires Lady Aberlin to dance, and leads Daniel to create a tiny mobile. Daniel suggests why Lady Elaine might be hurting people's feelings. Rogers does a video insert of his visit to a lady's pottery.

- Aired on August 29, 2001.
- This episode marks the last time Daniel's clock is used, as well as Daniel Tiger's last appearance in the series.

== Episode 4 (Celebrate the Arts) ==
Rogers makes his final visit to Negri's Music Shop, where he meets an expert playing the glass harmonica. In the Neighborhood of Make-Believe, several discover just why Lady Elaine is hurting people's feelings.

- Aired on August 30, 2001.
- This was Lady Aberlin, Elsie Jean, Handyman Negri, and Joe Negri's last appearance in the television network.

== Episode 5 (Celebrate the Arts) ==
Everyone in the Neighborhood of Make-Believe now knows that Lady Elaine is still dwelling on that day long ago when somebody hurt her feelings. When the time comes to judge the artwork, she arrives not with a judgment but with a collage of all the neighbors. Mr. McFeely and Mr. Rogers share a video collage of artists in their various fields.

- Aired on August 31, 2001.
- This was Mr. McFeely, Mayor Maggie, Neighbor Aber, King Friday XIII, Betty Okonak Templeton, and Lady Elaine's last appearance in the series.
- It is always thought that this is the only time in the series that Mr. Rogers and Mr. McFeely shake hands but actually, this is not true. The opening of the episode "Christmastime with Mister Rogers" is one example of the contrary.
- This was the final episode of the series.
- Fred Rogers died almost two years later of stomach cancer at the age of 74.
