= Mister Rogers' Neighborhood season 26 =

Mister Rogers' Neighborhood
- Season 26
- No. of episodes: 20

Release
- Original network: PBS

Season chronology
- ← Previous; Season 25 Next → Season 27

The following is a list of episodes from the 26th season of the PBS series, Mister Rogers' Neighborhood, which aired between October 1995 and August 1996. There were 20 episodes in the season. This was the last season to have more than 15 episodes, and the last to be aired across two calendar years. The first broadcast of Mister Rogers' Neighborhood was on the National Educational Television network on February 19, 1968.

== Episode 1 (Mad Feelings) ==
Rogers visits Red Grooms' studio, where he is currently working on a painting of the trolley. The Neighborhood of Make-Believe sees Lady Elaine in fits because she can't seem to draw the Eiffel Tower well.

- Aired on October 16, 1995.

== Episode 2 (Mad Feelings) ==
Maggie Stewart brings a water-and-oil motion sculpture to the television house. Jay Styperk, a wheelchair basketball specialist, gives Rogers a few exercises. The Neighborhood of Make-Believe is startled to see Lady Elaine has turned the Eiffel Tower upside down.

- Aired on October 17, 1995.

== Episode 3 (Mad Feelings) ==
Lady Elaine Fairchilde is distraught that, in a fit of anger, she has turned Mr. McFeely into a doll. Afterwards Mr. Rogers goes to the laundry room and does clothes the laundry room is on the right by the front door so after that he shows a fast film of chuck aber filling in when he had a meeting

- Aired on October 18, 1995.

== Episode 4 (Mad Feelings) ==
Betty Okonak Templeton visits the Neighborhood of Make-Believe in an effort to ease Lady Elaine's mean mood.

- Aired on October 19, 1995.

== Episode 5 (Mad Feelings) ==
Rogers attends the rehearsals for Stomp. The Neighborhood of Make-Believe comforts a harried Lady Elaine, who rights the Eiffel Tower and learns that Mr. McFeely was not turned into a doll after all. by the way maggie stewart picks the doll up and drops off the video on how people make dolls

- Aired on October 20, 1995.

== Episode 6 (Transformations) ==
Mr. McFeely presents Rogers with a "hide-and-find ball", with which they play a little hide-and-seek. Rogers hears a storyteller at Mrs. McFeely's house. The Neighborhood of Make-Believe gets puzzled by a gift for Purple Panda, which is one that he is not supposed to open.

- Aired on February 19, 1996.
- This episode originally featured Mr. McFeely delivering a laser pointer to Mister Rogers from his friend J.D. After concerns over laser pointers were voiced, it was changed to a "hide-and-find ball". It is often believed that the concerns were over the safety of laser pointers but in his interview for the Archive of American Television, Fred Rogers explains that it was more than that:

"Somebody wrote to us and said, "Do you realize that that could be harmful to people's eyes?" Well, it turns out that it's not harmful to people's eyes but what it is harmful is that there must be laser things like that on guns that show where to shoot...I don't want people thinking that we want to hurt anybody."

- Aside from the laser pointer being changed to a "hide-and-find ball", there are several smaller details that show evidence of a total reshoot;

In the reshoot, Mister Rogers has a pen in his shirt pocket. In the original, no pen.

The shape of the water colors in the kitchen is different between the two versions of this episode.

In addition to the house segments being reshot, the credits for this episode were redone as well. In the revised credits, "John Costa" is changed to "Johnny Costa".

- This episode was made before, while, or after working on the Curiosity episodes.

== Episode 7 (Transformations) ==
JoAnn Swaim does a juggling act outside Rogers' television house. Rogers shows pictures of the show's neighbors as children and as adults. The Neighborhood of Make-Believe is looking for Purple Panda so they can give him his package.

- Aired on February 20, 1996.

== Episode 8 (Transformations) ==
Rogers demonstrates that he doesn't change when he wears dark glasses or a black wig. Lady Aberlin tries the same tactic in the Neighborhood of Make-Believe. Mister Rogers Shows A Videotape Of Maggie Stewart Getting A Haircut Mr. McFeely shows a time-lapse videotape of how the television house is set up in the studios of WQED in Pittsburgh.

- Aired on February 21, 1996.
- Although some earlier episodes had Rogers showing how parts of the studio worked, this is the first time any episode has featured how the studio set gets created.

== Episode 9 (Transformations) ==
Rogers fixes the ball float in the toilet. Maggie Stewart demonstrates some sign language, using a book in the process. The Neighborhood of Make-Believe remains perplexed by the mysterious package for Purple Panda. And things don't get any better once Purple Panda arrives.

- Aired on February 22, 1996.

== Episode 10 (Transformations) ==
Rogers shows a wooden egg that contains a speckled egg. He then returns to the McFeely's house, where plants are transplanted and ducklings are delivered. In the Neighborhood of Make-Believe, Lady Elaine Fairchilde retrieves the package for Purple Panda. Much to everyone's surprise, the package opens itself. Back at the McFeely's house Maggie Stewart is there instead of Mr. McFeely as he went in the hospital for eye surgery.

- Aired on February 23, 1996.

== Episode 11 (Helping) ==
Lady Elaine frets about all the noise made by someone's "vacuum sweeper".

- Aired on July 22, 1996.

== Episode 12 (Helping) ==
Jabali Afrika performs at Negri's Music Shop. Lady Elaine Fairchilde has a bad dream about "vacuum sweepers," where she dances with one while in human size and tries to rid them from the Neighborhood of Make-Believe.

- Aired on July 23, 1996.
- Any potential performer of the life-sized Lady Elaine remains uncredited, but in 2019, Matt Meko, the second performer of Purple Panda, revealed that he was the performer of the human-sized Lady Elaine through social media.

== Episode 13 (Helping) ==
Rogers visits B. Smith's restaurant and reunites with B. Smith herself. Smith returns to the Neighborhood of Make-Believe and leaves a napkin for Queen Sara. But the napkin is swept away, because of Lady Elaine's army of "vacuum sweepers".

- Aired on July 24, 1996.
- B. Smith makes her first appearance on the show since 1969.

== Episode 14 (Helping) ==
After Rogers draws with some colored chalk, he sees a videotape on how this type of chalk is made. In the Neighborhood of Make-Believe, Purple Panda is called on to help Lady Elaine overcome her fear of "vacuum sweepers".

- Aired on July 25, 1996.

== Episode 15 (Helping) ==
Purple Panda sings a song that helps Lady Elaine overcome her fear of "vacuum sweepers". Rogers' visits an inner-city arts center for children in Los Angeles.

- Aired on July 26, 1996.

== Episode 16 (Brave and Strong) ==
The Neighborhood of Make-Believe has witnessed cereal falling like snow over a couple of areas. It stops snowing cereal over at the Platypus Mound, but not at Daniel's Clock.

- Aired on August 26, 1996.

== Episode 17 (Brave and Strong) ==
Rogers' friend Brad Brewer, a knitter and puppeteer, talks of the puppets and puppet shows he has performed in. In the Neighborhood of Make-Believe, Elsie Jean Platypus explains that the cereal stopped falling on the Platypus Mound when she wasn't afraid of it. But Daniel is afraid of the cereal snowfall on his Clock.

- Aired on August 27, 1996.

== Episode 18 (Brave and Strong) ==
Rogers visits the McFeelys' house to see the lambs they are babysitting. Mr. McFeely plays a videotape on how lambs are sheared. as he leaves chuck aber arrives at the front door and brings a video of a dead bird The Neighborhood of Make-Believe sends armor-clad King Friday to the Clock, where he will attempt to command the cereal to stop falling. But only Daniel's presence at the Clock can stop the downpour.

- Aired on August 28, 1996.

== Episode 19 (Brave and Strong) ==
Rogers takes viewers to see his immunization at a doctor's office. Daniel finally faces his fears, with the aid of Chuck Aber and Lady Aberlin. They give him an inflatable boat prior to appearing at the Clock. Only Daniel can stop the falling cereal at the Clock, and he does.

- Aired on August 29, 1996.
- Rogers' immunization scene was done to alleviate the fears of young viewers, because he does not change into his sweater immediately at the start of the episode.

== Episode 20 (Brave and Strong) ==
With the crisis at the Neighborhood of Make-Believe over, Daniel asks that his pile of fallen cereal should be distributed to the people who need it most. A forklift is just the tool to cart boxes of cereal from the Clock.

- Aired on August 30, 1996.
