= Mister Rogers' Neighborhood season 22 =

Mister Rogers' Neighborhood
- Season 22
- No. of episodes: 15

Release
- Original network: PBS

Season chronology
- ← Previous; Season 21 Next → Season 23

The following is a list of episodes from the twenty-second season of the PBS series, Mister Rogers' Neighborhood, which aired between November 1991 and August 1992. The first broadcast of Mister Rogers' Neighborhood was on the National Educational Television network on February 19, 1968.

== Episode 1 (Art) ==
Mr. McFeely shows Rogers a portrait of Mrs. McFeely, that Bob Trow made. Rogers goes to see Trow do a portrait of Mr. McFeely. King Friday declares that everyone in the Neighborhood should produce Royal portraits.

- Aired on November 25, 1991.

== Episode 2 (Art) ==
Rogers shows a flip book and presents Picasso art. He also sees a Spanish rhythm quartet at Brockett's Bakery. In the Neighborhood of Make-Believe, Lady Aberlin, X, and Henrietta make King Friday art, but Lady Elaine refuses.

- Aired on November 26, 1991.

== Episode 3 (Art) ==
Mr. Rogers describes the day he met a skywriter. The Neighborhood of Make-Believe witnesses a skywriter drawing King Friday's face and hears Handyman Negri's contribution.

- Aired on November 27, 1991.

== Episode 4 (Art) ==
Rogers makes his own clay and visits sculptor Bill Strickland. Lady Elaine uses her clay to deface all the existing portraits and other dedications to King Friday.

- Aired on November 28, 1991.

== Episode 5 (Art) ==
Rogers tells a story about a boy who painted a tree blue and how his feelings were hurt. In the Neighborhood of Make-Believe, Daniel submits a painting of a blue King Friday.

- Aired on November 29, 1991.

== Episode 6 (Imaginary Friends) ==
Rogers draws a song. Mr. McFeely brings in a videotape to show how felt-tip markers are made. The Neighborhood of Make-Believe gets another "glimpse" of Daniel's imaginary friend, Malcolm Apricot Dinko.

- Aired on February 24, 1992.

== Episode 7 (Imaginary Friends) ==
Rogers talks of using a telescope, although it is a pretend one. Bob Trow talks of how he used his imagination as a boy, making up what would be "troll talk." Robert Troll demonstrates this in the Neighborhood of Make-Believe.

- Aired on February 25, 1992.

== Episode 8 (Imaginary Friends) ==
Rogers sees a ballet troupe do a dance with umbrellas. As it is raining in the Neighborhood of Make-Believe, Chuck Aber tests Corny's new umbrella rocking chair.

- Aired on February 26, 1992.

== Episode 9 (Imaginary Friends) ==
Rogers uses a real book and he reads to a pretend child sitting in a real chair. The Neighborhood of Make-Believe sees Prince Tuesday's rag doll for the last time.

- Aired on February 27, 1992.

== Episode 10 (Imaginary Friends) ==
Ella Jenkins stages a sing-along at Brockett's Bakery. Lady Elaine tries to blame Malcolm Apricot Dinko for something. Ella Jenkins Returns With A Film Of Mr Rogers Playing A Trumpet And A Videotape Of How People Make Sardines and after that Maggie Stewart Brings a Videotape Of Sesame Street Characters

- Aired on February 28, 1992.

== Episode 11 (Learning) ==
Mr. McFeely accidentally brings whistles to Rogers' front porch, and both hear a professional whistler. In the Neighborhood of Make-Believe, Robert Troll is taking a census. Daniel cannot help at this time, as he and the other schoolchildren are planning a field trip.

- Aired on August 24, 1992.

== Episode 12 (Learning) ==
Lady Aberlin searches for the source of a wind that abruptly appears and disappears.

- Aired on August 25, 1992.

== Episode 13 (Learning) ==
Rogers hangs a paper chain through the kitchen and living room and Lady Aberlin discovers the wind source.

- Aired on August 26, 1992.

== Episode 14 (Learning) ==
The school at Someplace Else is ready to stage their field trip through the Neighborhood of Make-Believe. But a major stumbling block emerges when James Michael Jones shows off his learning machine on his head. Rogers talks to blind jazz saxophonist Eric Kloss at the neighborhood library.

- Aired on August 27, 1992.

== Episode 15 (Learning) ==
Rogers displays a variety of batteries, ready to put them to work in two toys and a cassette player. Mister McFeely then shows Rogers a battery-operated car. While the Neighborhood of Make-Believe remains undecided if there will be a field trip, Daniel suggests not to sacrifice anything in the learning process.

- Aired on August 28, 1992.
