= Mister Rogers' Neighborhood season 27 =

Mister Rogers' Neighborhood
- Season 27
- No. of episodes: 10

Release
- Original network: PBS

Season chronology
- ← Previous; Season 26 Next → Season 28

The following is a list of episodes from the twenty-seventh season of the PBS series, Mister Rogers' Neighborhood, which aired in 1997. The first broadcast of Mister Rogers' Neighborhood was on the National Educational Television network on February 19, 1968.

== Episode 1 (Sharing) ==
After a swim, King Friday is startled to find that his crown has been taken.

- Aired on February 17, 1997.

== Episode 2 (Sharing) ==
Rogers displays a horse Leonard Streckfus constructed from found objects. He also visits Streckfus at his workshop, where other found-objects sculptures are on display. In the Neighborhood of Make-Believe, Mayor Maggie learns the Westwood town sign is missing. It appears Lady Elaine has taken it for her "found" objects exhibit.

- Aired on February 18, 1997.

== Episode 3 (Sharing) ==
Mr. McFeely shows a videotape on how apple juice is made. The Neighborhood of Make-Believe continues to see things disappear, just as Lady Elaine is ready to hold a "found objects" exhibit at her Museum-Go-Round.

- Aired on February 19, 1997.

== Episode 4 (Sharing) ==
Rogers visits Gonzales at his studio to see goupet-goupet sculptures. In the Neighborhood of Make-Believe, more things have gone missing, including Edgar Cooke's refrigerator and Daniel's truck. Ms Jane Shows A Video On How People Make Water

- Aired on February 20, 1997.

== Episode 5 (Sharing) ==
Mr. McFeely shows a videotape on how heavy equipment is used in construction sites. In the Neighborhood of Make-Believe, Lady Elaine agrees to display and return all those "borrowed" things. But there is a trick or two involved.

- Aired on February 21, 1997.
- Bill Nye makes a guest appearance near the end of this episode. Fred refers to him as, "Bill Nye, the Science Guy", referencing Nye's popular science program.

== Episode 6 (Be Yourself) ==
Rogers visits a theater to see a juggling act called the Flying Karamazov Brothers. In the Neighborhood of Make-Believe, X is preparing to give flying lessons.

- Aired on August 25, 1997.

== Episode 7 (Be Yourself) ==
Mr. Rogers visits David Copperfield and learns a magic trick. In the Neighborhood of Make-Believe, X gives his first simple flying lesson to Prince Tuesday. This isn't quite what Lady Elaine has in mind with her flying lessons.

- Aired on August 26, 1997.

== Episode 8 (Be Yourself) ==
Rogers hears the Uptown String Quartet perform. In the Neighborhood of Make-Believe, a vulnerable Prince Tuesday falls prey to Lady Elaine's "flying lessons".

- Aired on August 27, 1997.

== Episode 9 (Be Yourself) ==
Rogers brings a sleeping bag into the television house. Mr. McFeely brings in a tape on how sleeping bags are made. Rogers visits a dollmaker, Ida Clowney. In the Neighborhood of Make-Believe, X feels responsible for the fall Prince Tuesday incurred. Lady Aberlin and Chuck Aber deter Lady Elaine from further "flying lessons".

- Aired on August 28, 1997.

== Episode 10 (Be Yourself) ==
Rogers enters with a hula hoop and visits a hula hoop expert. In the Neighborhood of Make-Believe, King Friday cancels X's flying lessons to punish Lady Elaine for hurting Prince Tuesday with her hat to help him fly.

- Aired on August 29, 1997.
