= Mister Rogers' Neighborhood season 30 =

2000 season of a television series

Mister Rogers' Neighborhood
- Season 30
- No. of episodes: 10

Release
- Original network: PBS

Season chronology
- ← Previous; Season 29 Next → Season 31

The following is a list of episodes from the penultimate season of the PBS series, Mister Rogers' Neighborhood, which aired in 2000. The first broadcast of Mister Rogers' Neighborhood was on the National Educational Television network on February 19, 1968.

== Episode 1 (Curiosity: A Field Trip to 'The Edible Schoolyard') ==
Rogers uses a frame to concentrate on small sections of a large mural. Seeing a set of vegetables in one section of the mural, he reflects on a visit to a vegetable garden, referred to as an "edible school yard". In the Neighborhood of Make-Believe, King Friday is irritated when Purple Panda and his compatriot, Little Panda, fool him. He commands that they cancel all curiosity.

- Aired on February 21, 2000.

== Episode 2 (Curiosity: Homemade Musical Instruments) ==
Rogers makes a shaker out of small lid tops and a can before seeing several homemade instruments played at Negri's Music Shop. In the Neighborhood of Make-Believe, Chuck Aber begins to build a truck frame around curious Daniel's Clock. Little Panda tries to show Prince Tuesday how to travel "the Purple way," but they both get lost.

- Aired on February 22, 2000.

== Episode 3 (Curiosity: Mister Rogers Rides in a Bucket) ==
Rogers visits a friend who takes him on a bucket lift prior to trimming trees. In the Neighborhood of Make-Believe, Purple Panda suggests that Little Panda and Prince Tuesday may not be on anyplace familiar.

- Aired on February 23, 2000.

== Episode 4 (Curiosity: Tony's Costume Book) ==
Rogers gives a final discussion on false faces. He then visits a new studio set, the toy-and-book store run by a new neighbor, Tony Chiroldes. In the Neighborhood of Make-Believe, everyone is still looking for Little Panda and Prince Tuesday. Betty Okonak Templeton uses a telescope, as do the others, to discover just the planet to seek. It is up to HulaMouse to rescue Tuesday and Little Panda.

- Aired on February 24, 2000.

== Episode 5 (Curiosity: A Visit with Violinist Hilary Hahn) ==
Rogers reads his own book titled "Daniel Striped Tiger Gets Ready for Bed". He visits with violinist Hilary Hahn at Negri's Music Shop. Nighttime grips the Neighborhood of Make-Believe with worry over Little Panda and Prince Tuesday. However, the two return safely much to everyone's relief.

- Aired on February 25, 2000.

== Episode 6 (Ready to Read?: A Baby Elephant at the Zoo) ==
Rogers immediately goes to see elephants of different sizes. He also shows a video on how backpacks are made. In the Neighborhood of Make-Believe, an over-curious King Friday asks that Cornflake S. Pecially should build a machine to look inside of things.

- Aired on August 28, 2000.

== Episode 7 (Ready to Read?: Look Carefully - One Way to Get Ready to Read) ==
Rogers visits guitarist Manuel Barrueco at Negri's Music Shop. In the Neighborhood of Make-Believe, Queen Sara gives HulaMouse a picture with several hoops and a few hidden letters.

- Aired on August 29, 2000.

== Episode 8 (Ready to Read?: Lots of Ways to Learn Words) ==
Rogers witnesses a majestic ballet dancer and her teacher. In the Neighborhood of Make-Believe, Lady Elaine reveals her plans for a new game show.

- Aired on August 30, 2000.

== Episode 9 (Ready to Read?: Trucks at Work) ==
Mister Rogers arrives holding a cardboard box. Inside is a toy truck. Mr. Roger's tells the audience how seeing a toy truck reminds him of the different trucks he sees around town. The scene then switches to a compilation of clips showing various trucks at work, from a garbage truck to a car transporter truck. Chuck Aber then stops by with H.J. Elephant and the book I Read Signs. He shows it to Mr. Rogers and explains to the viewers what different signs such as "Don't Walk" and "Come In, We're Open" mean. Chuck Aber then visits the television house with H.J. Elephant and the book I Read Signs. In the Neighborhood of Make-Believe, Lady Aberlin discovers H.J. Elephant III knows sign language. What nobody knows is how to get H.J. involved in The Reading Game.

- Aired on August 31, 2000.

== Episode 10 (Ready to Read?: Baseball Caps and How People Make Them) ==
Given assistance from Mayor Maggie, H.J. Elephant reads his first words on Lady Elaine's new show, The Reading Game. Mr. McFeely shows Rogers a video on how ball caps are made.

- Aired on September 1, 2000.
