= Mister Rogers' Neighborhood season 20 =

Mister Rogers' Neighborhood
- Season 20
- No. of episodes: 15

Release
- Original network: PBS

Season chronology
- ← Previous; Season 19 Next → Season 21

The following is a list of episodes from the twentieth season of the PBS series, Mister Rogers' Neighborhood, which aired between November 1989 and August 1990. The first broadcast of Mister Rogers' Neighborhood was on the National Educational Television network on February 19, 1968.

== Episode 1 (When Parents Go to Work) ==
Negri's Music Shop needs Rogers' help when the lady at the cashier must see her sick child. Negri and Rogers propose a Neighborhood of Make-Believe story in which King Friday and Queen Sara leave on Tuesday for their errands.

- Aired on November 20, 1989.

== Episode 2 (When Parents Go to Work) ==
Rogers and Mr. McFeely make treats with peanuts and peanut butter. In the Neighborhood of Make-Believe, Prince Tuesday is still angry that his parents are running errands all the time.

- Aired on November 21, 1989.

== Episode 3 (When Parents Go to Work) ==
Wearing a lei of peanut shells as he enters, Rogers promotes reading the rest of the week. Mr. McFeely brings a video on how peanut butter is made. In the Neighborhood of Make-Believe, Henrietta suggests that Cornflake S. Pecially's factory start a caring center for the children of the factory's workers.

- Aired on November 22, 1989.

== Episode 4 (When Parents Go to Work) ==
Rogers visits oboist Natasha at Negri's Music Shop. The Neighborhood of Make-Believe begins work in earnest on the new child-caring center at Corny's factory.

- Aired on November 23, 1989.

== Episode 5 (When Parents Go to Work) ==
Balloon artist Bruce Franco visits Rogers' television house. He has even made a trolley-shaped balloon. In the Neighborhood of Make-Believe, Prince Tuesday helps those who run the child-caring center at Corny's factory.

- Aired on November 24, 1989.

== Episode 6 (Environment) ==
A major crisis has arisen in the Neighborhood of Make-Believe. Their nearby landfill at Someplace Else has reached the saturation point.

- Aired on April 16, 1990.

== Episode 7 (Environment) ==
Mister Rogers and Mr. McFeely visit the neighborhood recycling center. Westwood Mayor Maggie informs that their landfill has been filled completely.

- Aired on April 17, 1990.

== Episode 8 (Environment) ==
Rogers discusses how to make artwork out of old objects. This precipitates Mr. McFeely's video, showing his visit with a spare-parts artist, Leo Sewell.

- Aired on April 18, 1990.

== Episode 9 (Environment) ==
Rogers recalls the snorkeling adventure he shared with Sylvia Earle. It leaves little time for Neighborhood of Make-Believe, which needs help from two of Northwood's goats.

- Aired on April 19, 1990.

== Episode 10 (Environment) ==
Mr. McFeely brings a goat into the television house to dispel a few myths. Mrs. Dingleborder and the goats of Northwood complement each other's plans to solve the appalling garbage crisis.

- Aired on April 20, 1990.

== Episode 11 (Fathers and Music) ==
Rogers enters with a bandaged hand. He illustrates that nothing changes underneath a bandage (similar to what he did in an earlier episode). Rogers attends the Marsalis Family's rehearsals at Negri's Music Shop.

- Aired on July 30, 1990.

== Episode 12 (Fathers and Music) ==
Mr. McFeely brings materials on how adhesive bandages are made. Rogers puts one such bandage on a rag doll. That rag doll becomes the plot point in the Neighborhood of Make-Believe, as King Friday and Prince Tuesday believe the doll to life.

- Aired on July 31, 1990.

== Episode 13 (Fathers and Music) ==
Chuck Aber brings a guest to the television house. Joining them are two wolves. Rogers' son Jim and grandson Alex stop over. In the Neighborhood of Make-Believe, Aber is dressed as a wolf, ready to offer a wolf costume to someone else.

- Aired on August 1, 1990.

== Episode 14 (Fathers and Music) ==
Rogers reads a book a teenage girl had made for her father. He then puts stuffing in a toy wolf for a friend. Ella Jenkins visits to perform some songs. Those in the Neighborhood of Make-Believe discuss their feelings about wolves. Daniel tells those at school that he doesn't have a musical father, like Ana and Prince Tuesday.

- Aired on August 2, 1990.

== Episode 15 (Fathers and Music) ==
Rogers discusses music with Yo-Yo Ma and, when son Nicholas Ma arrives, Rogers helps perform a trio of The Skaters' Waltz. In the Neighborhood of Make-Believe, Lady Aberlin finds a musical father for Daniel.

- Aired on August 3, 1990.
