= Mister Rogers' Neighborhood season 25 =

Mister Rogers' Neighborhood
- Season 25
- No. of episodes: 10

Release
- Original network: PBS

Season chronology
- ← Previous; Season 24 Next → Season 26

The following is a list of episodes from the twenty-fifth season of the PBS series, Mister Rogers' Neighborhood, which aired in 1995. The first broadcast of Mister Rogers' Neighborhood was on the National Educational Television network on February 19, 1968.

== Episode 1 (Fast and Slow) ==
Rogers wants to take his time playing a game with a ball and a few tubes. Mister Rogers wanted to educate children on sometimes doing things slowly can make for a better outcome

- Aired on February 20, 1995.

== Episode 2 (Fast and Slow) ==
Mr Roger's displays the production of rollerblades. Mr. Rogers rollerblades with Stephen Lee at a skating rink. Stephen Owl appears in his full safety gear to help the neighbors' cause.

- Aired on February 21, 1995.

== Episode 3 (Fast and Slow) ==
Mr Rogers educates children on how letters become words. Daniel is astonished at how fast Prince Tuesday can say the letters of the alphabet. Lady Aberlin gives Daniel the confidence true friends have.

- Aired on February 22, 1995.

== Episode 4 (Fast and Slow) ==
Chainey Umphrey returns to the neighborhood to demonstrate more gymnastics. In the Neighborhood of Make-Believe, everyone tries to stop the speeding Trolley.

- Aired on February 23, 1995.

== Episode 5 (Fast and Slow) ==
Rogers operates a toy crane in the sandbox. In the Neighborhood of Make-Believe, a much larger crane finally catches the Trolley and lifts it up, so the neighbors can figure out how it can slow down.

- Aired on February 24, 1995.

== Episode 6 (Everybody's Special) ==
Maggie Stewart and Chef Brockett are making layer sandwiches for Maggie's upcoming family reunion. Rogers shows a video on how Corelle dinner plates are made. Chef Brockett discusses with the Royal Family the cake being planned for Cornflake S. Pecially's birthday.

- Aired on August 28, 1995.
- This is the last episode Chef Brockett is seen. This episode was dedicated to him.

== Episode 7 (Everybody's Special) ==
The Royal Family continues their plans to Cornflake S. Pecially's birthday and to comfort Prince Tuesday (enlisting Robert Troll in the process). Rogers also shows a video on how wooden shoes are made. Marilyn Barnett appears in this episode with two students of hers, 12-year-old twin sisters Kelly and Meghan Fillnow (Kelly wears pink and Meghan wears turquoise), who enjoy sports such as basketball, soccer, and gymnastics.

- Aired on August 29, 1995.

== Episode 8 (Everybody's Special) ==
Lady Aberlin, dressed as a lion, discovers the dour Prince Tuesday, who is upset that his robe disrupts his guitar lessons.

- Aired on August 30, 1995.

== Episode 9 (Everybody's Special) ==
Rogers shows some of the Neighborhood of Make-Believe puppets and introduces the puppeteer who created Prince Tuesday, Lenny Meledandri. In the Neighborhood of Make-Believe, several people have to console Prince Tuesday, who has removed his robe.

- Aired on August 31, 1995.

== Episode 10 (Everybody's Special) ==
Cornflake S. Pecially feels everyone has forgotten that today is his birthday. It adds to the drama of the surprise birthday party, for which Daniel and Prince Tuesday have made a card.

- Aired on September 1, 1995.
