= Mister Rogers' Neighborhood season 21 =

Mister Rogers' Neighborhood
- Season 21
- No. of episodes: 15

Release
- Original network: PBS

Season chronology
- ← Previous; Season 20 Next → Season 22

The following is a list of episodes from the twenty-first season of the PBS series, Mister Rogers' Neighborhood, which aired between November 1990 and August 1991. The first broadcast of Mister Rogers' Neighborhood was on the National Educational Television network on February 19, 1968.

== Episode 1 (Mouths and Feelings) ==
Chef Brockett makes gingerbread faces that have different emotions. King Friday appoints Lady Aberlin as the Director of Research. Her first assignment revolves around people's reaction to a box that plays a recording of someone laughing.

- Aired on November 19, 1990.

== Episode 2 (Mouths and Feelings) ==
Rogers makes a tunnel out of a cardboard tube. In the Neighborhood of Make-Believe, Lady Aberlin continues her research with the laughing voice in a box. Robert Troll believes a little person is in that box. Rogers also presents a “Speak and Spell”, a toy that plays sound effects of different farm animals when the strings with the word written on the grip, of the animal attached to the pictures of the different animals are pulled.

- Aired on November 20, 1990.

== Episode 3 (Mouths and Feelings) ==
Mr. McFeely shows a videotape on how toothbrushes are made. In the Neighborhood of Make-Believe, Lady Aberlin wishes to show there is no person inside the laughing-voice box. What she uncovers, lets her become a tiger for a limited time.

- Aired on November 21, 1990.

== Episode 4 (Mouths and Feelings) ==
Rogers visits a dentist's office and talks about teeth care. In the Neighborhood of Make-Believe, a disguised Lady Aberlin goes to the school at Someplace Else.

- Aired on November 22, 1990.

== Episode 5 (Mouths and Feelings) ==
Rogers explains how a steam shovel works. He reads “Are You My Mother?”, by PD Eastman after a montage of a steam shovel. Daniel finds out Lady Aberlin has been disguised as a tiger.

- Aired on November 23, 1990.

== Episode 6 (Growing) ==
Mr. McFeely arrives with a new advertising jingle for his Speedy Delivery service. He also shows a video on how model cars are made. Concern grips Westwood and then the Neighborhood of Make-Believe when some big thing is spotted nearby.

- Aired on February 25, 1991.
- This is the first episode to feature Mr. McFeely's second Special Delivery song, which is titled as "Is there anything you want?/Is there anything you need?". This song was frequently used from 1991 until the end of the series in 2001.

== Episode 7 (Growing) ==
Rogers plants a bean seed and joins Mr. McFeely in a visit to a local conservatory. In the Neighborhood of Make-Believe, King Friday tries to allay fears about a "big thing" rolling its way in from Westwood.

- Aired on February 26, 1991.

== Episode 8 (Growing) ==
The Big Thing arrives in the Neighborhood of Make-Believe. At the request of several neighbors, the King agrees to maintain and talk of peaceful things.

- Aired on February 27, 1991.

== Episode 9 (Growing) ==
Rogers gets a haircut so he can prove to viewers there is nothing that harms anybody during a haircut. Robert Troll drops by the Neighborhood of Make-Believe and gives some aid to the Big Thing.

- Aired on February 28, 1991.

== Episode 10 (Growing) ==
Rogers finds François Clemmons, now singing with the Harlem Spiritual Ensemble. Purple Panda returns to the Neighborhood of Make-Believe with a miracle ingredient that makes plants grow quickly.

- Aired on March 1, 1991.

== Episode 11 (Dress-Up) ==
Rogers recalls a raccoon dance first performed two decades before, by using a toy raccoon. He uses a raccoon mask to illustrate he does not change when he puts on the mask. In the Neighborhood of Make-Believe, Harriet and Lady Aberlin are surprised to see King Friday disguised as a bird. He learns that Harriet and Lady Aberlin are planning a play with the schoolchildren.

- Aired on August 26, 1991.

== Episode 12 (Dress-Up) ==
Rogers and Mr. McFeely visit a children's book reading at the library. In the Neighborhood of Make-Believe, all the schoolchildren are getting roles for their upcoming play.

- Aired on August 27, 1991.

== Episode 13 (Dress-Up) ==
Rogers shows a few wigs and glasses, all of which disguise his appearance. In the Neighborhood of Make-Believe, attention seems to shift away from the school play and more toward finding King Friday's spare crown.

- Aired on August 28, 1991.

== Episode 14 (Dress-Up) ==
Nobody can find King Friday's spare crown. Lady Elaine Fairchilde is implored to turn the Neighborhood of Make-Believe upside down to aid in the search, which leads to some unimaginable conclusions. Rogers visits an auditorium to hear the Boys Choir of Harlem.

- Aired on August 29, 1991.

== Episode 15 (Dress-Up) ==
Maggie Stewart, disguised as Mr. McFeely, delivers to Rogers a video on how zipper sweaters are made. The Neighborhood of Make-Believe witnesses the school play.

- Aired on August 30, 1991.
