= Mister Rogers' Neighborhood season 29 =

Mister Rogers' Neighborhood
- Season 29
- No. of episodes: 15

Release
- Original network: PBS

Season chronology
- ← Previous; Season 28 Next → Season 30

The following is a list of episodes from the 29th season of the PBS series, Mister Rogers' Neighborhood, which aired in 1999. This was the last season to have more than 10 episodes. The first broadcast of Mister Rogers' Neighborhood was on the National Educational Television network on February 19, 1968.

== Episode 1 (Noisy and Quiet) ==
Rogers witnesses the Westminster Choir College Bell Choir. Mr. McFeely shows a video on how bells are made. In the Neighborhood of Make-Believe, Mayor Maggie presents a loud bell to Henrietta. That bell quickly becomes a big irritant to the others.

- Aired on February 15, 1999.

== Episode 2 (Noisy and Quiet) ==
Rogers attends the rehearsals for a dance team that performs with long ribbons. Henrietta, X, and a muted Bob Dog are frightened when they see so many of their neighbors in strange costumes. What they don't know is that these costumed neighbors are staging a parade.

This is the last episode that Bob Trow appears in. He died a few months before it aired.

- Aired on February 16, 1999.

== Episode 3 (Noisy and Quiet) ==
Rogers visits drum performer Tim Adams. In the Neighborhood of Make-Believe, X and Henrietta have rigged their tree so that, at the first sign of anything unnatural, everyone will hear constant drumming.

- Aired on February 17, 1999.

== Episode 4 (Noisy and Quiet) ==
Rogers recounts his snorkeling adventure with Sylvia Earle, back from 1990. Sylvia Earle visits the television house, and screens a videotape on the sounds of fish. In the Neighborhood of Make-Believe, everyone is upset at the constant bell-ringing and drumming at Henrietta and X's tree. No one can convince him to stop, especially since fewer and fewer neighbors remain uncostumed.

- Aired on February 18, 1999.

== Episode 5 (Noisy and Quiet) ==
Chuck Aber, dressed as a marching-band leader, visits the television house to borrow one of Rogers' noisemakers. Contrasting the noise is Rogers' contention that a smile is quiet and lovable. The Neighborhood of Make-Believe is ready for its costume-laden parade, but must convince X and Henrietta of the parade's nature.

- Aired on February 19, 1999.

== Episode 6 (Go-Stop-Go) ==
Rogers assembles a fountain in his kitchen. He shows a videotape of numerous fountains from around the world. Mr. McFeely shows a videotape on how raincoats are made. In the Neighborhood of Make-Believe, King Friday donates the old castle fountain to Mayor Maggie and the people of Westwood. Lady Elaine gets a gift as well. Chuck Aber gives her a nozzle to squirt water.

- Aired on July 26, 1999.

== Episode 7 (Go-Stop-Go) ==
Rogers and Chuck Aber discuss the proper safety gear for inline skating. then those 2 watch a film about painting houses at night Those in the Neighborhood of Make-Believe think they have made progress to curb Lady Elaine's random squirts. Mr. McFeely shows a video on how concrete sidewalks are made.

- Aired on July 27, 1999.

== Episode 8 (Go-Stop-Go) ==
Mr. Rogers visits Marc Brown, creator of the Arthur book series and shows him how he draws Arthur. After explaining how the TV show is made, they watch a clip of the episode "Arthur Meets Mister Rogers", which Rogers himself guest-starred on, and meet Michael Yarmush, who does the voice of Arthur and Arthur himself shows up in the Neighborhood of Make-Believe, greeting several neighbors — including Lady Elaine. Rogers and Mr. McFeely views a video on how traffic lights are assembled.

- Aired on July 28, 1999.
- This is the second time Mister Rogers' Neighborhood has featured a character from another PBS show, the first was in season 11.

== Episode 9 (Go-Stop-Go) ==
Rogers takes an extended trip to the Pittsburgh fire station. The lessons learned there, extend to the Neighborhood of Make-Believe, as several neighbors become volunteer fire fighters. Maggie Stewart brings a videotape of children dressing up in costumes.

- Aired on July 29, 1999.

== Episode 10 (Go-Stop-Go) ==
Rogers goes to a school gym class to dance and exercise where he witnesses a school fire drill. The Neighborhood of Make-Believe gives support to the Platypus family following the previous day's fire. King Friday gives an award to Lady Elaine for her action. Chuck Aber Brings A Videotape On How People Make Christmas Trees

- Aired on July 30, 1999.

== Episode 11 (When Things Get Broken) ==
Rogers enters with a computer mouse and introduces viewers to a different room of the television house. He introduces viewers to the online neighborhood (). Mr. McFeely shows a video on how a computer mouse is fixed. In the Neighborhood of Make-Believe, King Friday and Queen Sara are searching for the "royal mouse". He has been in the Museum-Go-Round, busily planning a surprise with Lady Elaine.

- Aired on August 23, 1999.

== Episode 12 (When Things Get Broken) ==
Rogers reads the library book When the TV Broke before visiting the neighborhood library. Once there, he finds a title the librarian recommends. Before he reads, Rogers sits in on a kids' crafts group. In the Neighborhood of Make-Believe, King Friday insists that the royal HulaMouse must return to the Castle. Chuck Aber sees him first, and when he takes HulaMouse to the Castle, they learn King Friday is flying around the world in search of him.

- Aired on August 24, 1999.

== Episode 13 (When Things Get Broken) ==
Rogers visits the studio of George Rhoads. He watches as Rhoads demonstrates one of his mechanical ball inventions. A co-worker shows Rogers around to see various men at work on these machines. In the Neighborhood of Make-Believe, King Friday returns, not at all pleased by HulaMouse's absence. At the height of his anger, he breaks a toy that Lady Aberlin has brought.

- Aired on August 25, 1999.

== Episode 14 (When Things Get Broken) ==
Joe Negri visits the television house to repair a ukulele. Mr. McFeely shows a videotape on how bread is made. Not everyone in the Neighborhood of Make-Believe has recovered from the shock of the day before. After King Friday tries an apology, Lady Elaine feels everything is ready for her surprise.

- Aired on August 26, 1999.

== Episode 15 (When Things Get Broken) ==
Rogers starts with a visit to a children's dance studio, where participants act out a story. In the Neighborhood of Make-Believe, King Friday truly apologizes for his acts. He joins everyone else at the Museum-Go-Round for Lady Elaine's exhibit.

- Aired on August 27, 1999.
