= Mister Rogers' Neighborhood season 18 =

Mister Rogers' Neighborhood
- Season 18
- No. of episodes: 15

Release
- Original network: PBS

Season chronology
- ← Previous; Season 17 Next → Season 19

The following is a list of episodes from the eighteenth season of the PBS series, Mister Rogers' Neighborhood, which aired in late 1987 and early 1988. The first broadcast of Mister Rogers' Neighborhood was on the National Educational Television network on February 19, 1968.

== Episode 1 (Alike and Different) ==
Rogers attends a show full of antique cars. In the Neighborhood of Make-Believe, Mayor Maggie and Queen Sara agree to change jobs for a day.

- Aired on November 23, 1987.

== Episode 2 (Alike and Different) ==
Rogers brings in a set of children's books that are done in different languages and Mr. McFeely brings a videotape of children's TV shows from three countries.

- Aired on November 24, 1987.

== Episode 3 (Alike and Different) ==
Robert Trow dresses up in his Bob Dog costume so that Rogers can compare a real hound to a man in a dog costume. In the Neighborhood of Make-Believe, everyone, except Prince Tuesday, knows Mayor Maggie and Queen Sara will trade places for a day. This leads to an inevitable misunderstanding.

- Aired on November 25, 1987.

== Episode 4 (Alike and Different) ==
Jeffrey Gabel, who is both a circus clown and cook, prepares strudel at Brockett's Bakery. Queen Sara and Mayor Maggie trade places for a day, until a mix-up occurs with Brockett and Gabel.

- Aired on November 26, 1987.

== Episode 5 (Alike and Different) ==
Jeff Gabel surprises Rogers by showing a few peeps. Rogers goes to a circus, where Gabel puts on his clown make-up. The Neighborhood of Make-Believe finds Lady Aberlin in a chicken costume, much to Daniel's dismay. Aberlin gives sound advice to Daniel and to Nancy Caterpillar.

- Aired on November 27, 1987.

== Episode 6 (Nighttime) ==
Rogers closes the curtains in his television house so that it resembles nighttime. This is so he can prepare for Mr. McFeely's delivery, a video on how flashlights are made. In the Neighborhood of Make-Believe, Lady Elaine frightens X with a talk of stars falling from the sky.

- Aired on March 7, 1988.

== Episode 7 (Nighttime) ==
Rogers recalls his visit to a Russian TV studio, guest-starring on Tatyana Vedeneyeva's nighttime children's show, Good Night, Little Ones!. The Neighborhood of Make-Believe still has to contend with Lady Elaine's talk of falling stars.

- Aired on March 8, 1988.

== Episode 8 (Nighttime) ==
Mr. McFeely brings a firefighter's outfit for Rogers to try on. Chuck Aber is preparing to scuba dive at night, but first he must help his neighbors in Southwood.

- Aired on March 9, 1988.

== Episode 9 (Nighttime) ==
Tatyana Vedeneyeva visits Rogers' television house and brings a videotape of how matrouska dolls are made. The Neighborhood of Make-Believe welcomes an unexpected visitor from the stars.

- Aired on March 10, 1988.

== Episode 10 (Nighttime) ==
Mr. McFeely shows a video of people doing their jobs at night. Dawn nears in the Neighborhood of Make-Believe and still no one can understand the night visitor.

- Aired on March 11, 1988.

== Episode 11 (Kindness and Unkindness) ==
A client reprimanded Mr. McFeely for delivering the wrong tape and Rogers receives it by mistake. Rogers soon reassures Mr. McFeely how important he and his service are. A difficult King Friday hears that Prince Tuesday and his classmates at school were playing music. Friday decides that Tuesday needs a different type of schooling.

- Aired on May 2, 1988.

== Episode 12 (Kindness and Unkindness) ==
Mister Rogers and his saxophonist friend, Eric Kloss, visit a cave with Betty Aberlin as tour guide. This cave has its own organ, on which Rogers accompanies Kloss's sax. Events accelerate at the Neighborhood of Make-Believe, as King Friday has arranged for "Sir Thomas T. Tune" to be Prince Tuesday's new tutor. X's Cousin Mary arrives with a new Owl Correspondence School lesson.

- Aired on May 3, 1988.

== Episode 13 (Kindness and Unkindness) ==
Marilyn Barnett shows how to start jumping rope and invites several expert rope-jumpers. In the Neighborhood of Make-Believe, King Friday is ready to take Prince Tuesday out of the school at Someplace Else.

- Aired on May 4, 1988.

== Episode 14 (Kindness and Unkindness) ==
Mr. McFeely brings a videotape of how bicycle helmets are made. The Neighborhood of Make-Believe is surprised to see "Sir Thomas T. Tune".

- Aired on May 5, 1988.

== Episode 15 (Kindness and Unkindness) ==
"Sir Thomas T. Tune" convinces King Friday to allow the new schooling method.

- Aired on May 6, 1988.
