= Mister Rogers' Neighborhood season 23 =

Mister Rogers' Neighborhood
- Season 23
- No. of episodes: 15

Release
- Original network: PBS

Season chronology
- ← Previous; Season 22 Next → Season 24

The following is a list of episodes from the twenty-third season of the PBS series, Mister Rogers' Neighborhood, which aired between November 1992 and August 1993. The first broadcast of Mister Rogers' Neighborhood was on the National Educational Television network on February 19, 1968.

== Episode 1 (Up & Down) ==
Rogers and Mr. McFeely ride an elevator and an escalator in a mall, to compare the differences. Lady Elaine accepts the delivery of a hydraulic platform.

- Aired on November 23, 1992.

== Episode 2 (Up & Down) ==
Famed domino artist Bob Speca Jr. sets up and knocks down dominoes at Negri's Music Shop. In the Neighborhood of Make-Believe, Robert Troll rides the hydraulic platform outside the Museum-Go-Round.

- Aired on November 24, 1992.

== Episode 3 (Up & Down) ==
King Friday wants the neighbors to find a place where Mimus polyglottos and Troglodytes aedon can take up dance lessons. While they are not looking, Robert Troll takes Mimus and Trog for a walk and dance, while Chuck Aber goes off looking for the birds.

- Aired on November 25, 1992.

== Episode 4 (Up & Down) ==
Rogers hears from clarinetist Richard Stoltzman. In the Neighborhood of Make-Believe, two crises remain unsolved. They are stopping the Museum-Go-Round from going up and down, and getting the wooden birds back.

- Aired on November 26, 1992.

== Episode 5 (Up & Down) ==
Bruce Franco makes balloon art, concentrating on animals. In the Neighborhood of Make-Believe, the hydraulic platform is fixed. By chance, Robert Troll is seen with the King's two wooden birds.

- Aired on November 27, 1992.

== Episode 6 (Love) ==
Rogers enters carrying a teddy bear and wearing a bear costume. Chuck Aber then brings in a video that shows how teddy bears are made. The Neighborhood of Make-Believe finds one of its neighbors in a bear costume.

- Aired on February 22, 1993.

== Episode 7 (Love) ==
Rogers shows a picture of one friend, an ornithologist, and visits him at The Aviary in Pittsburgh. Lady Elaine Fairchilde is readying a "Museum of Love." At Mayor Maggie's suggestion, Lady Elaine decides to start a soap opera.

- Aired on February 23, 1993.

== Episode 8 (Love) ==
Rogers soaks his feet in a pool outside his porch and "Officer" Clemmons makes an unexpected visit. In the Neighborhood of Make-Believe, Lady Elaine is preparing to do a soap opera she calls "As the Museum Turns". Meanwhile, King Friday, Queen Sara, and Prince Tuesday get angry at each other, in front of Lady Aberlin.

- Aired on February 24, 1993.
- This is the last appearance of Francois Clemmons.

== Episode 9 (Love) ==
Rogers discusses the way of how images are reflected in mirrors. Lady Elaine continues preparations for her one-woman soap opera.

- Aired on February 25, 1993.
- Lady Aberlin questioning love was also in episode 1309.

== Episode 10 (Love) ==
Rogers uses bubble mix and a wand to make large bubbles and discovers he has no running water. Before things are fixed, he remembers his visit to a kitchen where he helped make spinach egg rolls. The Neighborhood of Make-Believe witnesses the soap opera at the Museum of Love. Some of the neighbors help Lady Elaine perform. And Then Maggie Stewart Brings A Videotape On How People Make Waffles and Ham

- Aired on February 26, 1993.

== Episode 11 (Then & Now) ==
Rogers does a science experiment involving food coloring and water. In the Neighborhood of Make-Believe, Robert Troll takes the Trolley off its tracks. This prompts several neighbors to search for it.

- Aired on August 30, 1993.

== Episode 12 (Then & Now) ==
Guest shadow artist Jim West performs silhouettes of various animals. Mr. McFeely shows a tape on how light bulbs are made. The Court of the Neighborhood of Make-Believe wants to return the shadows of Harriet Elizabeth Cow, Donkey Hodie, X, and Henrietta. Before long, Robert Troll reveals the Trolley's Extra Dimension to Lady Aberlin.

- Aired on August 31, 1993.

== Episode 13 (Then & Now) ==
Mr. McFeely brings a pantomimist to Rogers' television house. The trolley's reputation for revealing the past spreads through the Neighborhood. It gets to the point where the Trolley turns the Neighborhood upside-down.

- Aired on September 1, 1993.

== Episode 14 (Then & Now) ==
Mr. McFeeley brings a dead bird into the television house and asks Rogers for a box in which to bury it. This prompts a Neighborhood of Make-Believe discussion of death as Lady Aberlin helps Henrietta and Daniel.

- Aired on September 2, 1993.

== Episode 15 (Then & Now) ==
Rogers visits Itzhak Perlman at a concert hall and reflects on his visit to Colonial Williamsburg.

- Aired on September 3, 1993.
- The "Then & Now" episodes have been the only time in the series where the Neighborhood Trolley has shown its Special Dimension, which is where it shows images from the past.
