= Mister Rogers' Neighborhood season 24 =

Mister Rogers' Neighborhood
- Season 24
- No. of episodes: 11

Release
- Original network: PBS

Season chronology
- ← Previous; Season 23 Next → Season 25

The following is a list of episodes from the twenty-fourth season of the PBS series, Mister Rogers' Neighborhood, which aired in 1994. The first broadcast of Mister Rogers' Neighborhood was on the National Educational Television network on February 19, 1968.

== Episode 1 (Things to Wear) ==
Rogers has brought a three-cornered hat from the 18th century. He and McFeely travel through the neighborhood, observing various hats certain people wear. Upon gaining interest in them, King Friday orders everyone to wear three-cornered hats.

- Aired on February 21, 1994.

== Episode 2 (Things to Wear) ==
Rogers inevitably fools Marilyn Barnett by donning the Bob Dog costume. Mr. McFeely shows a videotape on how blue jeans are made. Lady Elaine Fairchilde provides the only resistance to King Friday's insistence that everyone and everything in the Neighborhood of Make-Believe should wear the three-cornered hat from the 18th century.

- Aired on February 22, 1994.

== Episode 3 (Things to Wear) ==
Rogers sees Alan Morrison play the organ at a nearby church. Lady Elaine Fairchilde squirts water at anyone who mentions "three-cornered hat" to her. King Friday hardens his position with a rule.

- Aired on February 23, 1994.

== Episode 4 (Things to Wear) ==
Chef Brockett explains how he uses canes to walk following his operation. Rogers returns to see Alan Morrison play alongside a flutist and a clarinetist. Betty Okonak Templeton visits the Neighborhood of Make-Believe with a way to break the impasse between King Friday and Lady Elaine.

- Aired on February 24, 1994.

== Episode 5 (Things to Wear) ==
Using a portable sewing machine, Rogers shows the stark contrast between clothing of today and clothes of the 1700s. Then he visits a building in Colonial Williamsburg. In the Neighborhood of Make-Believe, Lady Elaine and Betty Okonak Templeton exploit the loophole in King Friday's three-cornered rule. Finally, everyone else takes off the hats.

- Aired on February 25, 1994.

== Episode 6 (Going Away and Coming Back) ==
A map of the world painted by a friend of Rogers is shown on the back of an old floor covering. Rogers demonstrates traveling from place to place. Dan Kamin demonstrates his mime act. He acts as a mime character in the Neighborhood of Make-Believe.

- Aired on August 29, 1994.

== Episode 7 (Going Away and Coming Back) ==
The Neighborhood of Make-Believe finds a newcomer. Stephen Owl, who is X's cousin, is in search of a tunnel believed to be in the neighborhood. Rogers shows the inside and outside of an ambulance.

- Aired on August 30, 1994.

== Episode 8 (Going Away and Coming Back) ==
Rogers gets a feel for shooting a basketball from a chair. This segues eventually to his visit with a wheelchair basketball team called the Steelwheelers. More residents in the Neighborhood of Make-Believe join in Stephen's search for a hidden tunnel. One clue comes from a scrap of paper.

- Aired on August 31, 1994.

== Episode 9 (Going Away and Coming Back) ==
Rogers uses a long piece of plumbing pipe to simulate a tunnel in which blocks and a car could travel through. Mr. McFeely shows a video of passing through a car wash. In the Neighborhood of Make-Believe, King Friday hears of the search for the lost tunnel. Lady Aberlin finds all the pieces to the old parable about it, and it is very close to X's tree.

- Aired on September 1, 1994.

== Episode 10 (Going Away and Coming Back) ==
Chuck Aber surprises Rogers with what he calls his "piece of equipment." It's heavy machinery used for digging dirt. Mr. McFeely shows a videotape on how tortilla chips are made from blue corn. Friends in the Neighborhood of Make-Believe discover the secret tunnel and learn where it goes.

- Aired on September 2, 1994.

== Fred Rogers' Heroes: Who's Helping America's Children? ==
A primetime special episode where Mister Rogers introduces his modern day heroes: Chicago-based high school dropout Olomenji O'Connor who runs Project Peace, a non-profit organization program that teaches children to resolve problems peacefully; Brewster, New York-based Sam Ross who runs Green Chimneys, a residential farm for abused children where they learn to take care of animals; and Shiprock, New Mexico-based Glojean Todacheene, a Native American activist who was then serving as the principal of Mesa Elementary School.

- Aired September 13, 1994.
