= Mister Rogers' Neighborhood season 19 =

Mister Rogers' Neighborhood
- Season 19
- No. of episodes: 15

Release
- Original network: PBS

Season chronology
- ← Previous; Season 18 Next → Season 20

The following is a list of episodes from the nineteenth season of the PBS series, Mister Rogers' Neighborhood, which aired in late 1988 and early 1989. The first broadcast of Mister Rogers' Neighborhood was on the National Educational Television network on February 19, 1968.

== Episode 1 (Secrets) ==
Rogers and Mr. McFeely visit a house that has been built into the side of a wall. The Neighborhood of Make-Believe gets word that Westwood is building a sandbox.

- Aired on November 21, 1988.

== Episode 2 (Secrets) ==
Rogers follows clues in a treasure hunt, the end of which leads to a balloon artist. Chuck Aber gives a balloon ring to Lady Elaine. She is overcome with the suggestion that Aber has proposed to her.

- Aired on November 22, 1988.

== Episode 3 (Secrets) ==
Mr. McFeely shows a videotape of his visit with sculptor Allen Dwight. He carves a marble structure, which McFeely gives to Rogers. Lady Elaine tells Lady Aberlin her secret.

- Aired on November 23, 1988.

== Episode 4 (Secrets) ==
Rogers meets with Crist Delmonico, who is a blind painter. In the Neighborhood of Make-Believe, Lady Elaine is about to tell all that she and Chuck Aber will get married. The news surprises everyone, especially Aber.

- Aired on November 24, 1988.

== Episode 5 (Secrets) ==
Rogers writes a message in invisible ink. Jim Rogers shows a videotape of how suitcases are made. In the Neighborhood of Make-Believe, Chuck Aber must inform Lady Elaine that he had no plans to marry her, but he does have some good news. Rogers finds a message that leads him outside, where several neighbors hold a birthday party for him.

- Aired on November 25, 1988.

== Episode 6 (Fun and Games) ==
Rogers listens to folk singers Andy Holiner and Alice Johnson. Mr Rogers Uses The Museum Go Round For The Neighborhood Of Make Believe On Behalf On Trolley In the Neighborhood of Make-Believe, several residents decide to wear hats for fun. Then along comes Randy S. Caribou, who can wear all the hats at once Mr Mcfeely Brings A Videotape On Installing A New Heater On The Bus

- Aired on February 20, 1989.

== Episode 7 (Fun and Games) ==
Rogers brings with him a clay figurine of Randy S. Caribou, and puts him within the Neighborhood of Make-Believe models. Rogers also watches a team of kids playing soccer. When the Make-Believe adventure starts, Randy plays hide-and-seek with the Trolley, but soon puts himself in a sticky situation when he accidentally squashes a cake that has been made to look like a soccer ball.

- Aired on February 21, 1989.

== Episode 8 (Fun and Games) ==
Rogers shows off various sorts of baskets, most of which Mr. McFeely brought. Rogers and McFeely visit the Special Olympics tryouts at the nearby school gymnasium. Lady Aberlin and Bob Dog invite King Friday to go 'round the mulberry bush. It is the first time King Friday has ever been asked to join in a game. When Randy S. Caribou talks about his emerging team, Bob Dog, Lady Aberlin and King Friday jump at the chance to join. The result is the King-Woman-Dog-Boy-Girl-Reindeer-Tiger Team.

- Aired on February 22, 1989.

== Episode 9 (Fun and Games) ==
Rogers shows a new board game based on the Neighborhood of Make-Believe and gets a visit from Suzie McConnell, an expert basketball player-teacher. Mr. McFeely shows a video of Dance Alloy, with dancers gliding along huge rubber balls. The Neighborhood of Make-Believe team rounds itself out, with Henrietta and X joining King Friday, Lady Aberlin, Bob Dog, Prince Tuesday, Ana Platypus, Daniel Tiger and Randy S. Caribou. Queen Sara prefers not to join.

- Aired on February 23, 1989.

== Episode 10 (Fun and Games) ==
Rogers, along with McFeely, go to a bowling alley to show how to play, and how the pin machine work. The hodgepodge team tries to decide what game to play. After a few sports are rejected, everyone decides to play hide and seek. Lady Elaine decides to find them all with her boomerang, but everyone feels they won by doing their best. Before leaving, Randy Caribou turns his jersey to Lady Elaine so she can be on the team.

- Aired on February 24, 1989.

== Episode 11 (Josephine the Short-Neck Giraffe) ==
Rogers and Mr. McFeely get a glimpse of the San Diego Zoo's Wild Animal Park, with Dr. Joan Embery as Rogers' guide. The unseen Princess Zelda is preparing a play about a giraffe with a short neck.

- Aired on May 1, 1989.

== Episode 12 (Josephine the Short-Neck Giraffe) ==
Rogers watches how a roll of film is developed at a film lab. The newly arrived Princess Zelda recruits the Neighborhood of Make-Believe residents to appear in the upcoming play.

- Aired on May 2, 1989.

== Episode 13 (Josephine the Short-Neck Giraffe) ==
"Josephine the Short-Neck Giraffe" begins with the melancholy Josephine yearning to grow a longer neck. Her friend, Hazel the Elephant, had told her to wish at the same spot for the past year, but nothing happened. Now Hazel tries to talk Josephine to attend the nearby school.

- Aired on May 3, 1989.

== Episode 14 (Josephine the Short-Neck Giraffe) ==
In the second part of "Josephine the Short-Neck Giraffe," Josephine and Hazel go to school, where they meet all sorts of other animals. Among the classmates are a shy giraffe and a snake that doesn't know how to hiss. Josephine attends the "Attractive Active Animals" class.

- Aired on May 4, 1989.

== Episode 15 (Josephine the Short-Neck Giraffe) ==
In the third part of "Josephine the Short-Neck Giraffe", Josephine feels that the school's Attractive, Active Animals class is not helping her, especially because Sam Snake has finally learned how to hiss. Hazel tells J.R. Giraffe to give Josephine words of encouragement. In the process, both J.R. and Josephine accept themselves, and each other, for who they are.

- Aired on May 5, 1989.
- This opera was a tribute to John Reardon, who has always been a part of the "Neighborhood" Operas who died on April 16, 1988.
- This is the last episode of the series to feature a play/opera.
