= Mister Rogers' Neighborhood season 16 =

Mister Rogers' Neighborhood
- Season 16
- No. of episodes: 16

Release
- Original network: PBS

Season chronology
- ← Previous; Season 15 Next → Season 17

The following is a list of episodes from the sixteenth season of the PBS series, Mister Rogers' Neighborhood, which aired in late 1985 and early 1986. The first broadcast of Mister Rogers' Neighborhood was on the National Educational Television network on February 19, 1968.

== Episode 1 (Families) ==
Rogers plants an orange seed and, with Mr. McFeely, and shows a sequence on how orange juice is made. He then drops by Brockett's Bakery, which has a sales display of several soy foods. The Neighborhood of Make-Believe sees more of the same, as Lady Aberlin distributes orange juice to all the neighbors. But the tempo of the week changes when she and X learn that Cousin Mary Owl will arrive the next day.

- Aired on November 25, 1985.

== Episode 2 (Families) ==
Before Cousin Mary arrives, X and Lady Aberlin go to Southwood to discover that Betty and James Michael Jones have adopted a daughter.

- Aired on November 26, 1985.

== Episode 3 (Families) ==
Rogers visits a girl's check-up at a pediatrician's office. Betty and James Michael Jones name their adopted daughter Carrie Dell.

- Aired on November 27, 1985.

== Episode 4 (Families) ==
Robert Trow shows two puppies in the yard outside Rogers' television house. He then delivers a film of different families in the neighborhood. With the Neighborhood of Make-Believe's cousin reunion nearing, Bob Dog and Ana Platypus adopt each other as cousins.

- Aired on November 28, 1985.

== Episode 5 (Families) ==
Rogers goes behind the scenes at the Penguin Encounter program in the zoo. Daniel is tentative about attending the cousins' reunion.

- Aired on November 29, 1985.

== Episode 6 (Making and Creating) ==
Rogers plays at his sand table. Later, he and Mr. McFeely go to a mini-golf course. Lady Elaine inspires the Neighborhood of Make-Believe by putting a car cover on the Trolley. This inspires everyone to make covers for a Museum-Go-Round exhibit. Mr Mcfeely stops by with a videotape.

- Aired on February 3, 1986.

== Episode 7 (Making and Creating) ==
Eva Kwong and her grandmother make dumplings at Brockett's Bakery. Corny contributes a rocking chair with a horse cover for Lady Elaine's exhibit, but the chair flies away. Mr Rogers Enters A Computer Room To Show The Website and Maggie Stewart Brings A Videotape On How People Make Puppets

- Aired on February 4, 1986.

== Episode 8 (Making and Creating) ==
Mr. McFeely demonstrates a new chair for Rogers and he shows a video on how rocking horses are made. In the Neighborhood of Make-Believe, Lady Elaine accepts covers from neighbors in both Westwood and Southwood. One exhibit not in her Museum-Go-Round is the rocking chair with the horse cover, which is flying above the Tree.

- Aired on February 5, 1986.

== Episode 9 (Making and Creating) ==
Rogers brings in a kitten and talks with two poets on his porch. Chuck Aber fools the Royal family with his King Friday cover. Mr McFeely and Maggie Stewart bring a videotape of Maggie Stewart dressing up as Mrs Mcfeely.

- Aired on February 6, 1986.

== Episode 10 (Making and Creating) ==
Rogers takes viewers to the construction site of a playground that is being built. In the Neighborhood of Make-Believe, the horse-covered rocking chair continues to fly around and many can't get it down.

- Aired on February 7, 1986.

== Episode 11 (Celebrations) ==
King Friday wants everyone to celebrate the imminent arrival of Friday's Comet. For her part, Lady Elaine is busy planning a surprise birthday party for a dour Henrietta.

- Aired on May 5, 1986.

== Episode 12 (Celebrations) ==
Rogers visits a planetarium to show how the projectors produce huge images of the stars onto the walls. In the Neighborhood of Make-Believe, King Friday intensifies the imposed celebrations for the imminent arrival of Friday's Comet.

- Aired on May 6, 1986.

== Episode 13 (Celebrations) ==
Rogers hears Wynton Marsalis at Negri's Music Shop. In the Neighborhood of Make-Believe, Lady Elaine is planning to disprove the talk that the upcoming comet is Friday's.

- Aired on May 7, 1986.

== Episode 14 (Celebrations) ==
Friday's Comet arrives in the Neighborhood of Make-Believe, bearing a note that neither King Friday nor anyone else will forget. They all go to the Museum-Go-Round for Henrietta's surprise birthday party. After the party, Henrietta is surprised to hear that Reardon is making a new opera that will air the next day.

- Aired on May 8, 1986.

== Episode 15 (Celebrations) ==
This episode features the opera "A Star for Kitty", in which a kitten wishes on a half-moon and has a vivid dream about the night sky. The cast includes operatic tenor Paul Spencer Adkins.

- Aired on May 9, 1986.
- This is the last series episode to feature an ordinary Neighborhood opera (Josephine the Short-Necked Giraffe, which aired in a later season, was a special opera).

Maggie Stewart Stops By A Videotape Of Cows

== Episode 16 (Families) ==
Mister Rogers' Neighborhood Families

- Aired: November 28, 1985
- Mister Rogers talks about adoption and his adopted sister. Also: a film about families; Ana wonders if she's adopted in an episode about families.
