= Mister Rogers' Neighborhood season 12 =

Mister Rogers' Neighborhood
- Season 12
- No. of episodes: 18

Release
- Original network: PBS
- Original release: February 28 – July 2, 1982

Season chronology
- ← Previous; Season 11 Next → Season 13

The following is a list of episodes from the twelfth season of the PBS series, Mister Rogers' Neighborhood, which aired in 1982. The first broadcast of Mister Rogers' Neighborhood was on the National Educational Television network on February 19, 1968.

== Episode 1 (Mister Rogers Talks to Parents About Discipline) ==
Rogers talks with children and parents about punishment and setting limits.

- Aired on February 28, 1982.

== Episode 2 (Mister Rogers Talks About DISCIPLINE) ==
At his Music Shop, Negri demonstrates a player piano and shows Rogers a video on how the rolls of them are made. In the Neighborhood of Make-Believe, an overworked Cornflake S. Pecially is trying to make miniature trolleys in addition to rocking chairs and pretzels.

- Aired on March 1, 1982.

== Episode 3 (Mister Rogers Talks About DISCIPLINE) ==
Rogers goes to a factory to see how dolls are made. An overeager X presses Corny into making dolls of King Friday, but it is more than anybody can handle, especially a jealous Lady Elaine.

- Aired on March 2, 1982.

== Episode 4 (Mister Rogers Talks About DISCIPLINE) ==
Rogers tells of the promise he had made to himself years before which leads to a film of him swimming. He also reminds viewers that one cannot coast through anything, that one must keep trying. In the Neighborhood of Make-Believe, King Friday is enraged that Lady Elaine has defaced the King Friday dolls at Corny's factory.

- Aired on March 3, 1982.

== Episode 5 (Mister Rogers Talks About DISCIPLINE) ==
Rogers talks with Peggy Fleming, who is practicing at a nearby arena. In the Neighborhood of Make-Believe, Lady Elaine knows she will be punished for defacing the King Friday dolls. She suggests that she will work at Corny's factory for two days.

- Aired on March 4, 1982.

== Episode 6 (Mister Rogers Talks About DISCIPLINE) ==
Rogers brings a blanket and shows a video on how blankets are made. Lady Elaine keeps Corny's factory running smoothly. She convinces Corny to manufacture only rocking chairs. Thus Corny bails out of pretzel-making after just a year.

- Aired on March 5, 1982.

== Episode 7 (Mister Rogers Talks to Parents About Pets) ==
Rogers previews the upcoming week of programs on pets, and also delves into other subject areas.

- Aired on May 30, 1982.

== Episode 8 (Mister Rogers Talks About PETS) ==
Rogers visits the home of Adelia Moore, who has been crafting many dolls and quilts for her children. On his return to the television house, he shows a film of people celebrating a doll's 100th birthday. In the Neighborhood of Make-Believe, everyone is preparing gifts for Ana Platypus's upcoming birthday.

- Aired on May 31, 1982.

== Episode 9 (Mister Rogers Talks About PETS) ==
Robert Trow calls Rogers to ask if he can look after his dog the next night. King Friday and Lady Elaine suggest the type of pet to give Ana for her birthday.

- Aired on June 1, 1982.

== Episode 10 (Mister Rogers Talks About PETS) ==
Mrs. McFeely stops by with a parrot before Robert Trow brings his dog, Barney, to Rogers for the night. In the Neighborhood of Make-Believe, Daniel is starting to lament over the shabby fire truck he is trying to build for Ana's birthday. King Friday gets disturbed over a talking parrot.

- Aired on June 2, 1982.

== Episode 11 (Mister Rogers Talks About PETS) ==
Mister Rogers reflects on his walk with Barney before Robert Trow collects him. A few are anxious for Ana's birthday to arrive the next morning.

- Aired on June 3, 1982.

== Episode 12 (Mister Rogers Talks About PETS) ==
Rogers visits the National Zoo in Washington, D.C., where Barbara Bingham invites him to help feed the giant pandas. The Neighborhood of Make-Believe holds a big parade for Ana's birthday, but that doesn't prevent Ana from a quiet birthday party with her friends. Rogers also does sign language for "I Love You."

- Aired on June 4, 1982.

== Episode 13 (Mister Rogers Talks to Parents About Make-Believe) ==
Rogers provides parents with a few guidelines about Make-Believe.

- Aired on June 27, 1982.

== Episode 14 (Mister Rogers Talks About MAKE-BELIEVE) ==
After displaying an array of spoons, Mister Rogers introduces the song "Let's Think Of Something To Do While We're Waiting" before a spoon-player visits. In the Neighborhood of Make-Believe, King Friday gives a proclamation for Lady Aberlin and Robert Troll to make a mountain beside the castle.

- Aired on June 28, 1982.

== Episode 15 (Mister Rogers Talks About MAKE-BELIEVE) ==
Mr. McFeely brings slides of various trees to show on Picture-Picture. The Neighborhood of Make-Believe is cut short when, in decorating the Eiffel Tower with trees, Queen Sara sprains her arm. Rogers talks about hospitals and emergency rooms.

- Aired on June 29, 1982.

== Episode 16 (Mister Rogers Talks About MAKE-BELIEVE) ==
When Chuck Aber retrieves his lost cat at Rogers' television house, they discuss seat belts and car seats for infants. King Friday climbs the mountain made from the Eiffel Tower to sip imaginary tea. Once there, he asks to organize an opera for the next Friday. Rogers presents clips of four previous operas.

- Aired on June 30, 1982.

== Episode 17 (Mister Rogers Talks About MAKE-BELIEVE) ==
Rogers makes popcorn in his kitchen. King Friday and others discover they will have to stage an opera without Reardon.

- Aired on July 1, 1982.

== Episode 18 (Mister Rogers Talks About MAKE-BELIEVE) ==
The Neighborhood of Make-Believe stages its Spoon Mountain opera. A mean figure called Wicked Knife and Fork kidnaps a baton-twirling cat and takes him to Spoon Mountain.

- Aired on July 2, 1982.
