= Mister Rogers' Neighborhood season 15 =

Mister Rogers' Neighborhood
- Season 15
- No. of episodes: 15

Release
- Original network: PBS

Season chronology
- ← Previous; Season 14 Next → Season 16

The following is a list of episodes from the fifteenth season of the PBS series, Mister Rogers' Neighborhood, which aired in late 1984 and early 1985. The first broadcast of Mister Rogers' Neighborhood was on the National Educational Television network on February 19, 1968.

== Episode 1 (Food) ==
Rogers enters with his ventriloquist dummy Hischer Booptrunk and tells a story of how his sister tried to feed Hischer, thinking he was hungry. Mr. Rogers shows a video clip of human babies and baby animals drinking milk from their mothers. Rogers then visits a place where applesauce is made. X wants to grow vegetables of his own, but he must be patient because what he believes to be "speedy seeds" take a day to grow.

- Aired on November 19, 1984.

== Episode 2 (Food) ==
Rogers does some mixing of granola for several neighbors and also shows how tofu is manufactured. In the Neighborhood of Make-Believe, X is puzzled that the food grown from his speedy seeds has been taken.

- Aired on November 20, 1984.

== Episode 3 (Food) ==
In the Neighborhood of Make-Believe, the "garden guards" catch the hungry culprit who is the Old Goat from Northwood. Only then do they realize Northwood has no food. King Friday arranges for an all-out effort to grow food for their Northwood neighbors.

- Aired on November 21, 1984.

== Episode 4 (Food) ==
Rogers goes to the soup division of Heinz Foods to see how soup is made. The Neighborhood of Make-Believe keeps its promise to grow food for Northwood but Daniel thinks he can grow a vegetable soup tree.

- Aired on November 22, 1984.

== Episode 5 (Food) ==
Rogers visits the home of music director and close friend Johnny Costa, who is preparing a pasta dinner. As the all-out effort for Northwood comes to a close, Bob tells Daniel the truth about the "vegetable soup tree".

- Aired on November 23, 1984.

== Episode 6 (No and Yes) ==
After a game of peekaboo, Rogers presents a portrait of his father, painted by Dianne Dengle. She has asked Rogers to pose for his own portrait, which she paints with bits of rolled-up newspaper. The Neighborhood of Make-Believe welcomes James Michael Jones, a specialist in "Exactly Like Me" portraits. Jones announces that he is moving to Southwood, where he will marry Betty Okonak Templeton.

- Aired on February 4, 1985.

== Episode 7 (No and Yes) ==
Rogers brings flowers to remind those of a lesson he learned when he was a boy. Mr. McFeely brings a video on how tricycles are made. Prince Tuesday disobeys an order from King Friday and is punished for trying to ride the royal tricycle. Meanwhile, Daniel expresses doubts in being the ring bearer at the wedding of James Michael Jones and Betty Okonak Templeton. Dianne Dengle is ready to present her portrait of Rogers. It shows him encircled with some of the Neighborhood of Make-Believe characters.

- Aired on February 5, 1985.

== Episode 8 (No and Yes) ==
Rogers gets a visit from a young breakdancer named Jermaine, before he is reunited with Chrissie Thompson, one of Mr. McFeely's granddaughters. Rogers presents her with a butterfly necklace as a symbol of freedom. In the Neighborhood of Make-Believe, Ana Platypus is mad that she does not have an active role in the upcoming wedding. Lady Aberlin tells Ana her attending the service is of an importance that all will see.

- Aired on February 6, 1985.

== Episode 9 (No and Yes) ==
Rogers goes to Brockett's Bakery to see José Cisneros' new specialty, which is rice with milk. Lady Aberlin and Betty Okonak Templeton give ring-bearer Daniel a tip on how to keep the wedding ring on the pillow.

- Aired on February 7, 1985.

== Episode 10 (No and Yes) ==
Rogers visits Eva Kwong at her house. Several from the Neighborhood of Make-Believe go to Southwood to attend the wedding of Betty Okonak Templeton and James Michael Jones.

- Aired on February 8, 1985.

== Episode 11 (Music) ==
Rogers walks off stage to meet the show's house band. King Friday agrees to hold a Bass Violin Festival but not everyone can play the bass violin. Lady Elaine begins to see around that problem.

- Aired on May 13, 1985.

== Episode 12 (Music) ==
Yo-Yo Ma, one of Rogers' closest friends, plays his cello at Negri's Music Shop. In the Neighborhood of Make-Believe, Lady Aberlin ponders her dilemma of how to honor King Friday's adamant request that she can play the bass, even though it is not one of her talents.

- Aired on May 14, 1985.

== Episode 13 (Music) ==
Ella Jenkins and Chuck Aber stop by for folk songs that keep everyone moving. Lady Aberlin doesn't know how to approach her offer to dance with a bass violin for the festival. Daniel suggests Lady Aberlin tell the truth to King Friday.

- Aired on May 15, 1985.

== Episode 14 (Music) ==
Rogers visits a brass quintet and Lady Aberlin and Handyman Negri meet the Royal trumpeters.

- Aired on May 16, 1985.

== Episode 15 (Music) ==
Rogers visits a man with a wide assortment of musical instruments. In the Neighborhood of Make-Believe, everyone hurries over to Westwood, where the Bass Violin Festival is held.

- Aired on May 17, 1985.
