= Mister Rogers' Neighborhood season 14 =

Mister Rogers' Neighborhood
- Season 14
- No. of episodes: 15

Release
- Original network: PBS

Season chronology
- ← Previous; Season 13 Next → Season 15

The following is a list of episodes from the fourteenth season of the PBS series, Mister Rogers' Neighborhood, which aired in late 1983 and early 1984. The first broadcast of Mister Rogers' Neighborhood was on the National Educational Television network on February 19, 1968.

== Episode 1 (Conflict) ==
Rogers sees a collection of toy banks. The Neighborhood of Make-Believe wants to buy a record player for the school, but something else grabs King Friday's attention - Corny is making all the parts for Southwood.

- Aired on November 7, 1983.
- This episode was previously lost.

== Episode 2 (Conflict) ==
Rogers goes to the U.S. Mint in Philadelphia to see how coins are made. A shallow King Friday jumps to the conclusion that Southwood is making bombs, and he wants to counter.

- Aired on November 8, 1983.
- This episode was previously lost.

== Episode 3 (Conflict) ==
Rogers demonstrates a Brailler. He then visits an unnamed cave to see the petroglyphs of an earlier civilization. Lady Elaine and Lady Aberlin are determined to prove that Southwood is a peaceful neighborhood.

- Aired on November 9, 1983.
- This episode was previously lost.

== Episode 4 (Conflict) ==
Rogers shows a video on how marbles are made. The Neighborhood of Make-Believe sends a peace delegation to Southwood, where the residents have used all the parts to make a bridge.

- Aired on November 10, 1983.
- This episode was previously lost.

== Episode 5 (Conflict) ==
Rogers brings a record player to his kitchen and shows a video on how record players are made. In the Neighborhood of Make-Believe, a festival of peace prompts King Friday to help the School at Someplace Else.

- Aired on November 11, 1983.
- This is the only episode, in which Rogers ends the program with a song called "Peace and Quiet", other than "It's Such a Good Feeling".
- Due to the content of the "Conflict" episodes being on bombs and war, and the recent events in the news pertaining to war and violence, which made them unsafe episodes for the younger viewers, they were removed from regular rotation on PBS after April 5, 1996.
- One hypothesis is that the "Conflict" episodes were created in direct response to the ABC TV movie The Day After, which contained graphic depictions of a nuclear war between the United States and the Soviet Union, and its after-effects in Lawrence, Kansas, unlike anything seen in past nuclear apocalypse movies. The episodes were made to help children who might have seen the movie to cope. However, the dates of both programs do not match this hypothesis. The first episode of the Conflict Week aired on November 7, 1983. The Day After aired on November 20. The episodes would have been written and produced well before the airing of "The Day After".
- Another controversy is that these episodes cannot be found anywhere on the internet as of February 2017. They are not included in the offering of Amazon Prime Video, which hosts many other episodes. However, two episodes suddenly appeared in March 2017 on YouTube, leading to speculation that the release was timed with President Trump's proposed budget which augmented military budget at the expense of domestic programs, particularly PBS, Arts, and Humanities, which closely matches the theme of Conflict week.
- During the May 2017 and March 2018 Twitch marathons of most episodes of the show, some episodes (including the "Conflict" episodes) were skipped over.
- This episode was previously lost.

== Episode 6 (Work) ==
Mister Rogers takes viewers to the headquarters of the U.S. Postal Service for an inside look and engraving and printing stamps. The Neighborhood of Make-Believe issues its annual report of services to neighbors. They reveal to have a surplus of 3,000.

- Aired on April 2, 1984.

== Episode 7 (Work) ==
Rogers visits a dairy farm to see how cows are milked. King Friday meets with a representative of a pool company. They reach a compromise by which the neighborhood can afford to build a new swimming pool.

- Aired on April 3, 1984.

== Episode 8 (Work) ==
Rogers looks for a washer for his kitchen faucet. He barters washers with Bob Trow, who is busy working on a water pump. In the Neighborhood of Make-Believe, construction crews unearth the old water pipes, all of which seem to leak.

- Aired on April 4, 1984.

== Episode 9 (Work) ==
Rogers goes to a grocery store and takes a look behind the scenes on how the food is brought in and prepared for going on the shelves. Daniel suggests the pool money be spent on new pipes for the neighborhood.

- Aired on April 5, 1984.

== Episode 10 (Work) ==
Rogers does a reality check by revealing the television house is part of a television studio and he shows some of the technical crew and the musicians. Rogers also shares pictures of his days as puppeteer of The Children's Corner.

The Neighborhood of Make-Believe finishes the new underground system of water pipes. While others are working on their disappointments, Westwood Mayor Maggie has good news in store for everyone.

- Aired on April 6, 1984.

== Episode 11 (Grandparents) ==
Rogers takes the model Neighborhood Trolley to the Pennsylvania Trolley Museum in Washington, PA filled with real trolleys. He rides one of the restored trollies (Philadelphia Rapid Transit Company #5326) in one direction and drives it back in the other direction. After returning to the television house, Rogers shows the controls of how he operates the Trolley. In the Neighborhood of Make-Believe, the Trolley and everyone else is surprised with a French trolley called "Grandparents' Express." It has a message for Grand-père that his granddaughter Colette is visiting.

- Aired on May 7, 1984.

== Episode 12 (Grandparents) ==
Rogers makes a wind chime out of straws and Maggie Stewart shows a video of how straws are made. Collette visits the Neighborhood of Make-Believe. Privately, Daniel is upset because he doesn't have a grandfather.

- Aired on May 8, 1984.

== Episode 13 (Grandparents) ==
Rogers talks about the time he enjoyed with his grandparents. The Neighborhood of Make-Believe sees Collette and Chuck Aber at the school, and they learn that Daniel wants a grandfather.

- Aired on May 9, 1984.

== Episode 14 (Grandparents) ==
Rogers visits an aquarium, while in the Neighborhood of Make-Believe, Reardon visits to help Daniel and others put together another opera.

- Aired on May 10, 1984.

== Episode 15 (Grandparents) ==
The Neighborhood of Make-Believe presents the opera "A Granddad for Daniel". In it, Daniel plays the son looking for someone to call his grandfather. Reardon plays a man who follows Daniel and his mother on a trolley ride through various exotic areas who turns out to be his grandfather in the end.

- Aired on May 11, 1984.
