= Mister Rogers' Neighborhood season 17 =

Mister Rogers' Neighborhood
- Season 17
- No. of episodes: 15

Release
- Original network: PBS

Season chronology
- ← Previous; Season 16 Next → Season 18

The following is a list of episodes from the seventeenth season of the PBS series, Mister Rogers' Neighborhood, which aired in late 1986 and early 1987. The first broadcast of Mister Rogers' Neighborhood was on the National Educational Television network on February 19, 1968.

== Episode 1 (Playthings) ==
Rogers makes a visit to 16-year-old Chainey Umphrey at the Neighborhood gym. Chuck Aber is also there working with his H.J. Elephant III puppet. Aber later appears in the Neighborhood of Make-Believe working the puppet. Together they visit Lady Elaine, who talks of a toy that no one has seen.

- Aired on November 24, 1986.

== Episode 2 (Playthings) ==
Rogers takes a tour of the Little Tikes Company, to observe the design and manufacture of children's toys. In the Neighborhood of Make-Believe, Lady Aberlin reveals the present addressed to Queen Sara. It is revealed to be a bicycle for Prince Tuesday, who is told that "Life is good."

- Aired on November 25, 1986.

== Episode 3 (Playthings) ==
Mr. McFeely shows a video of his visit to an air traffic control tower. H.J. Elephant is searching for a flying key. He finds it on Prince Tuesday's new bicycle.

- Aired on November 26, 1986.

== Episode 4 (Playthings) ==
Lady Aberlin has the magic key that she hopes will open the door to a closed room in the Museum-Go-Round. What she and a couple of neighbors don't count on is that Lady Elaine is absent. All of them decide to wait for her return before they try to work the key. Rogers finds Bobby Rawsthorne demonstrating odd musical instruments at Negri's Music Shop.

- Aired on November 27, 1986.

== Episode 5 (Playthings) ==
Rogers shows a videotape of his visit to Lucy, who is a fake wooden elephant on the Jersey coast. He also takes viewers to the toy-lending library. In the Neighborhood of Make-Believe, Lady Elaine finally opens the door to the locked room in the Museum-Go-Round. But all what they find is left to their imagination.

- Aired on November 28, 1986.

== Episode 6 (Dance) ==
Daniel receives a tai chi lesson in another Neighborhood of Make-Believe that is only half-raining.

- Aired on March 9, 1987.

== Episode 7 (Dance) ==
Rogers goes to one of the SeaWorld theme parks to see the killer whales, Shamu and Namu, dance with the spectators. In the Neighborhood of Make-Believe, Lady Elaine sets up a dance studio and invites only the females, because she knows that men don't dance.

- Aired on March 10, 1987.

== Episode 8 (Dance) ==
Rogers first sees Sam Weber demonstrating his tap-dancing skills. Mr. McFeely shows a videotape on how shoes are made. Sam Weber also visits the Neighborhood of Make-Believe to disprove Lady Elaine's belief that men don't dance.

- Aired on March 11, 1987.

== Episode 9 (Dance) ==
Rogers visits the Dance Theatre of Harlem. Lady Elaine changes the name of her dance studio and sends dance invitations to all the men, except for Grand-père.

- Aired on March 12, 1987.

== Episode 10 (Dance) ==
Rogers visits an expert weaver and helps in making a scarf. Lady Elaine invites the Junior Tamburitzans to her studio.

- Aired on March 13, 1987.

== Episode 11 (Making Mistakes) ==
Rogers starts off the program by showing a picture book of animals, but the giraffe picture is misplaced as a skunk and the skunk image is misplaced as a giraffe. Susan Linn enters with the puppets she uses in talking to children. The puppets also go to the Neighborhood of Make-Believe all week. One of them, Audrey Duck, has her feelings hurt.

- Aired on May 4, 1987.

== Episode 12 (Making Mistakes) ==
Mr. McFeely brings the corrected animal book with the skunk and giraffe captions in their proper places. He shows a videotape on how books are made. In the Neighborhood of Make-Believe, Audrey Duck is overwhelmed with the thought of reading her poem to so many people.

- Aired on May 5, 1987.

== Episode 13 (Making Mistakes) ==
Rogers has gone to a meeting, so Chuck Aber fills him in at the television house. In the Neighborhood of Make-Believe, a visiting Mr. Skunk feels embarrassed because, in a frightened moment, he sprays Audrey Duck and the surroundings.

- Aired on May 6, 1987.

== Episode 14 (Making Mistakes) ==
Rogers hears André Watts playing the piano at a recital hall. Audrey Duck is ashamed to show herself.

- Aired on May 7, 1987.

== Episode 15 (Making Mistakes) ==
Rogers goes to Brockett's Bakery for a sing-along. The Neighborhood of Make-Believe stages its much-anticipated poetry reading, with Audrey Duck at the center of attention.

- Aired on May 8, 1987.
