= Mister Rogers' Neighborhood =

American children's television series

- Genre: Children's television series; Preschool; Educational
- Created by: Fred Rogers
- Starring: Fred Rogers; David Newell; Chuck Aber; Betty Aberlin; Don Brockett; François Clemmons; Bob Trow; Joe Negri
- Theme music composer: Fred Rogers
- Opening theme: "Won't You Be My Neighbor?"
- Ending theme: "Tomorrow" (1968–1972); "The Weekend Song" (Fridays, 1971–1972); "It's Such a Good Feeling" (1973–2001)
- Composers: Johnny Costa (musical director); Fred Rogers (songs)
- Country of origin: United States
- Original language: English
- No. of seasons: 31
- No. of episodes: 912 (including specials)

Production
- Production locations: WQED Studios; Pittsburgh, Pennsylvania
- Camera setup: Multi-camera
- Running time: 28 minutes
- Production companies: WQED; Small World Enterprises (1968–1971); Family Communications (1971–2001)

Original release
- Network: NET
- Release: February 19, 1968 – May 1, 1970
- Network: PBS
- Release: February 15, 1971 – February 20, 1976
- Release: August 27, 1979 – August 31, 2001

Related
- Daniel Tiger's Neighborhood; Donkey Hodie

Mister Rogers' Neighborhood (sometimes shortened to Mister Rogers and spelled Mister Rogers' Neighbourhood in Canada) is an American half-hour educational children's television series that ran from 1968 to 2001. It was created and hosted by Fred Rogers. Its original incarnation, the series Misterogers debuted in Canada on October 15, 1962, on CBC Television. In 1966, Rogers moved back to the United States creating Misterogers' Neighborhood (sometimes shown as MisteRogers' Neighborhood), later structured as Mister Rogers' Neighborhood, on the regional Eastern Educational Television Network (EETN, a forerunner of today's American Public Television). The American national debut of the show occurred on February 19, 1968. It aired on NET and its successor, PBS, until August 31, 2001.

The series is aimed primarily at preschool children ages 2 to 5, but it was labeled by PBS as "appropriate for all ages". Mister Rogers' Neighborhood was produced by Pittsburgh, Pennsylvania public broadcaster WQED and Rogers' non-profit production company Family Communications, Inc., previously known as Small World Enterprises prior to 1971; the company was renamed The Fred Rogers Company after Rogers' death (it has since been renamed again to Fred Rogers Productions as of 2019). In May 1997, the series surpassed Captain Kangaroo as the longest-running children's television series, a record the series held until June 2003, when Sesame Street beat Mister Rogers' record. The series could be seen in reruns on most PBS stations until August 31, 2007, when it began to be removed by various PBS stations, and was then permanently removed from the daily syndicated schedule by PBS after August 29, 2008.

Eleven years after Mister Rogers' Neighborhood concluded, PBS and CBC debuted an animated spin-off, Daniel Tiger's Neighborhood. A 50th-anniversary tribute and a PBS pledge-drive show, hosted by actor Michael Keaton (who got his start on the show), titled Mister Rogers: It's You I Like, premiered on PBS stations nationwide on March 6, 2018.

In December 2023, Variety ranked Mister Rogers' Neighborhood #89 on its list of the 100 greatest TV shows of all time.

== History ==
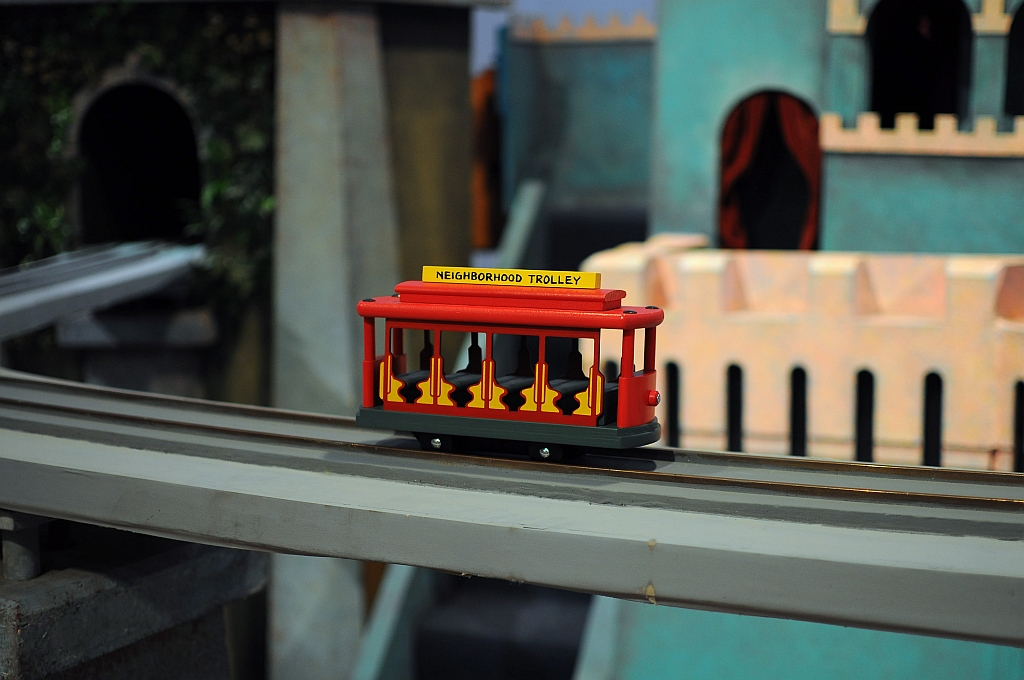
Neighborhood Trolley from Mister Rogers' Neighborhood set at WQED studios in Pittsburgh.

The series had its genesis in 1953, when Rogers and Josie Carey joined the newly formed public television station WQED. On April 5, 1954, WQED debuted The Children's Corner, a program featuring Rogers as puppeteer and composer, with Carey as host and lyricist, in an unscripted weekday-afternoon live television program. It was on this program where many of the puppets, characters and music used in the later series were developed, such as King Friday XIII, Daniel Tiger, and X the Owl. It was also the time when Rogers began wearing his famous sneakers, as he found them to be quieter than his work shoes while he was moving about behind the set. The show was briefly broadcast nationally on the NBC Television Network.

=== CBC television ===
Rogers moved to Toronto in 1961 to work on a new series based on The Children's Corner, called Misterogers, a 15-minute program on CBC Television. Misterogers aired on CBC for about four years, and a number of the set pieces that he would take with him back to the United States, such as the trolley and castle, were created for the Canadian program by CBC designers and in collaboration with producer Bruce Attridge. Most importantly, Rogers appeared on camera in the new show rather than only appearing through puppets or characters. Fred Rainsberry, head of Children's Programming at CBC, persuaded Rogers to appear on camera in the new show (which he named after Rogers) after seeing him interact with children. Ernie Coombs, one of the Americans whom Rogers brought with him to help develop the CBC show, would remain with CBC, on Rogers' recommendation, after Rogers returned to the United States. Coombs first appeared as Mr. Dressup in the CBC program Butternut Square, conceived and produced by Attridge. Coombs then helped to develop what became Mr. Dressup, which ran for nearly 30 years as an iconic presence on Canadian television, ending in 1996.

=== Move to WQED ===
In 1966, Rogers acquired the rights to his program from CBC and moved the show to WQED in Pittsburgh, where he had worked on The Children's Corner. He renamed the show Misterogers' Neighborhood, which initially aired regionally in the northeastern United States through EEN, including educational stations in Boston, Washington, D.C., and New York City. The 100 episodes of the half-hour show incorporated the "Neighborhood of Make-Believe" segments from the CBC episodes with additional reality-based opening and closing material produced in Pittsburgh. The series was cancelled in 1967 due to lack of funding, but an outpouring of public response prompted a search for new funding.

In 1967, The Sears Roebuck Foundation provided funding for the program, which enabled it to be seen nationwide on National Educational Television; taping began on September 21, 1967 for the first national season. The first national broadcast of Misterogers' Neighborhood appeared on most NET stations on February 19, 1968. In 1970, when PBS replaced NET, it also inherited this program. Around the same time, the show had a slight title change, to the more-familiar Mister Rogers' Neighborhood.

The show was broadcast from February 19, 1968, to February 20, 1976, and again from August 27, 1979, to August 31, 2001. The final episode was recorded on December 1, 2000. The studio at WQED in Pittsburgh in which the series was recorded was later renamed "The Fred Rogers Studio".

== Format ==
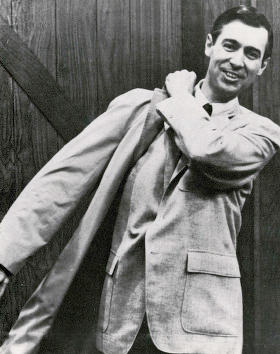
Rogers on the set in the late 1960s

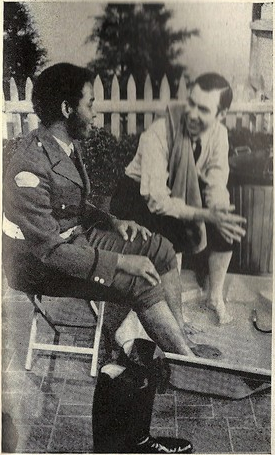
Rogers and Officer Clemmons having a foot bath in 1969, breaking a well known color barrier

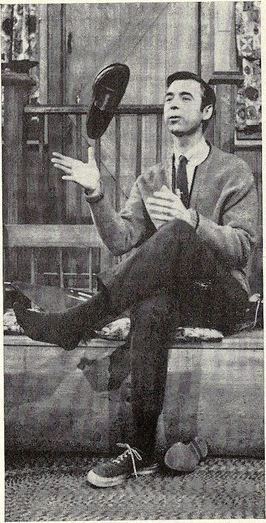
Rogers changing shoes

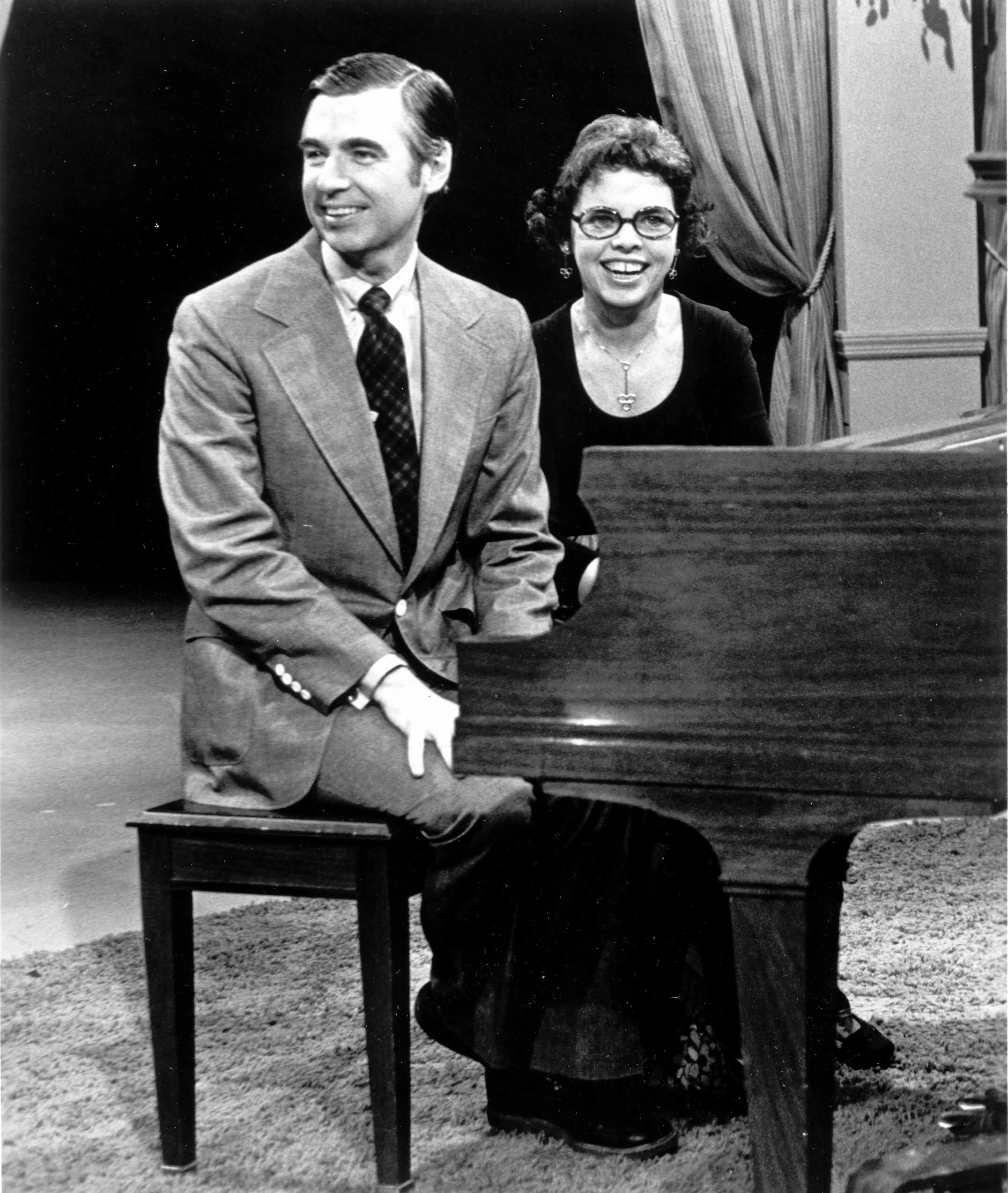
Rogers and wife Joanne Rogers, 1975

During each half-hour segment, Rogers spoke directly to the viewer about various topics, taking the viewer on tours of factories, demonstrating experiments, crafts, and music, and interacting with his friends. Rogers also made a point simply to behave naturally on camera rather than acting out a character, stating that "One of the greatest gifts you can give anybody is the gift of your honest self. I also believe that kids can spot a phony a mile away". The half-hour episodes were punctuated by a puppet segment chronicling occurrences in the Neighborhood of Make-Believe. Another segment of the show consisted of Rogers going to different places around the neighborhood, where he interviewed people to talk about their work and other contributions that focused on the episode's theme, such as Brockett's Bakery, Bob Trow's Workshop, and Negri's Music Shop. In one episode, Rogers took the show behind-the-scenes on the set of The Incredible Hulk, which aired on CBS from 1978 to 1982.

At the start of each episode, the show's logo appears as the camera pans slowly over a model of the neighborhood, as the camera goes from the neighborhood to inside the Rogers' television house. From 1979 to 1981, an alternate version of the opening sequence was used. Beginning in the early 1980s, the neighborhood model incorporated a small version of the "Neighborhood Trolley", as it crosses several streets from left to right on a model train track. This is the same model electric trolley that later in the program would transport viewers into the Neighborhood of Make-Believe. Usually, the camera goes from the neighborhood to out on the porch of the Rogers' television house, where the viewers see Fred Rogers coming for a visit before he enters the house. After the camera goes from the neighborhood to inside the Rogers' television house, Fred Rogers is seen coming home with his jacket on, singing "Won't You Be My Neighbor?". He goes into the closet, takes off his jacket, hangs it up, and grabs a cardigan zipper sweater to put on. After that, he takes his dress shoes off and grabs a pair of blue sneakers to put on. One of Rogers' sweaters now hangs in the Smithsonian Institution, a testament to the cultural influence of his simple daily ritual.

At the end of each episode, Rogers sang "It's Such a Good Feeling" (a different song, "Tomorrow" was used from 1968 to 1972) when he took off his sneakers as he says "You're alive" in a higher-toned voice, and grabs his dress shoes to put back on, and then snaps his fingers two times. After that, Rogers goes into the closet, takes off his cardigan, hangs it up, and grabs his jacket to put back on. Before the closing credits, Rogers got ready to go out the door by reminding the viewers: "You always make each day a special day. You know how: By just your being you/yourself. There's only one person in the whole world that's like you, and that's you. And people can like you just/exactly the way you are. I'll be back next time. Bye-bye!". During the closing credits, which is complete with the show's logo and the episode number, the camera would perform a reversed version of the opening sequence's pan shot, while the "Neighborhood Trolley" crosses streets from right to left.

Starting in 1979, episodes were grouped into week-long series, with each series focused on a particular topic; each opening includes that week's subject, in the form of "Mister Rogers Talks About [subject]". Rogers' monologues throughout the week explore various facets of the topic, and the ongoing story from the Neighborhood of Make-Believe serves as illustration.

Rogers covered a broad range of topics over the years, and the series did not shy away from issues that other children's programming avoided. In fact, Rogers endeared himself to many when, on March 23, 1970, he dealt with the death of one of his pet goldfish. The series also dealt with competition, divorce, and war. Rogers returned to the topic of anger regularly and focused on peaceful ways of dealing with angry feelings.

Beginning in the third season, Mister Rogers always made a clear distinction between the realistic world of his television neighborhood and the fantasy world of Make-Believe (prior to that, the line was blurred somewhat as he would often talk about it as if it were real and he had a direct line of contact with the characters in it). He often discussed what was going to happen in Make-Believe before the next fantasy segment was shown ("Let's pretend that Prince Tuesday has been having scary dreams..."), and sometimes acted out bits of Make-Believe with models on a table before the camera transitioned to the live-action puppet rendition. The miniature motorized trolley, which was known in character form as "Trolley", with its accompanying fast-paced piano theme music, and which was operated by Rogers with his left hand, working buttons and controls hidden on the side of the bench on which Rogers usually would sit, was the only element that appeared regularly in both the realistic world and Make-Believe: it was used to transport viewers from one realm to the other. Rogers, however, was mentioned from time to time in Make-Believe, particularly by Mr. McFeely, who appeared occasionally in the Make-Believe segments and seemed to form a link between the two worlds. The idea of the trolley came from Rogers. When he was young, many trolleys operated in Pittsburgh, and he liked riding on them. This reality/fantasy distinction put Rogers' series in sharp contrast with other children's series, such as Sesame Street and Captain Kangaroo, which freely mixed realistic and fantastic elements.

Trolley was a character in its own right. Often, when it crossed into the Neighborhood of Make Believe, it would stop and have a "conversation" with King Friday XIII (by moving back and forth slightly and making whistle and bell noises to respond to Friday), then continue on. Trolley also truly showed the difference between the worlds during the week when the three youngest puppet characters (Daniel Striped Tiger, Prince Tuesday, and Ana Platypus) prepared for and went to school for the first time, as it played the school bus. When in Mister Rogers' house, it simply had two pieces of yellow construction paper shaped and drawn like the profile of a school bus stuck to its sides, but in the Neighborhood of Make-Believe, it had a chassis on it that made it look like a school bus.

The series featured "Picture Picture", a rear-projection motion picture and slide projector, whose screen was encased with a picture frame. In early episodes, Picture Picture would show various films or slides at Mister Rogers' command; after the material was presented, Mister Rogers would thank Picture Picture, to which it would return a "You're Welcome" on its screen. After 1970, Picture Picture no longer operated magically, becoming merely a projector; Mister Rogers would insert a film, slides or videotape through a slot on the side, then show the material using a wired remote control (slides were viewed on Picture Picture; films and video were faded in to the clip). When Picture Picture was not used, a different painting would be displayed on its screen. Often it would display the words "Hello" or "Hi" at the opening.

The series was also notable for its use of jazz-inspired music, mostly arranged and performed by Johnny Costa, until Costa's death in 1996, when he was succeeded by Michael Moricz for the remainder of the series. The music was unique in its simplicity and flow that blended with the series' sketches and features. The music was usually played live during taping. Lyrics and melodies were written and sung by Rogers, who created more than 200 original songs.

== Characters ==
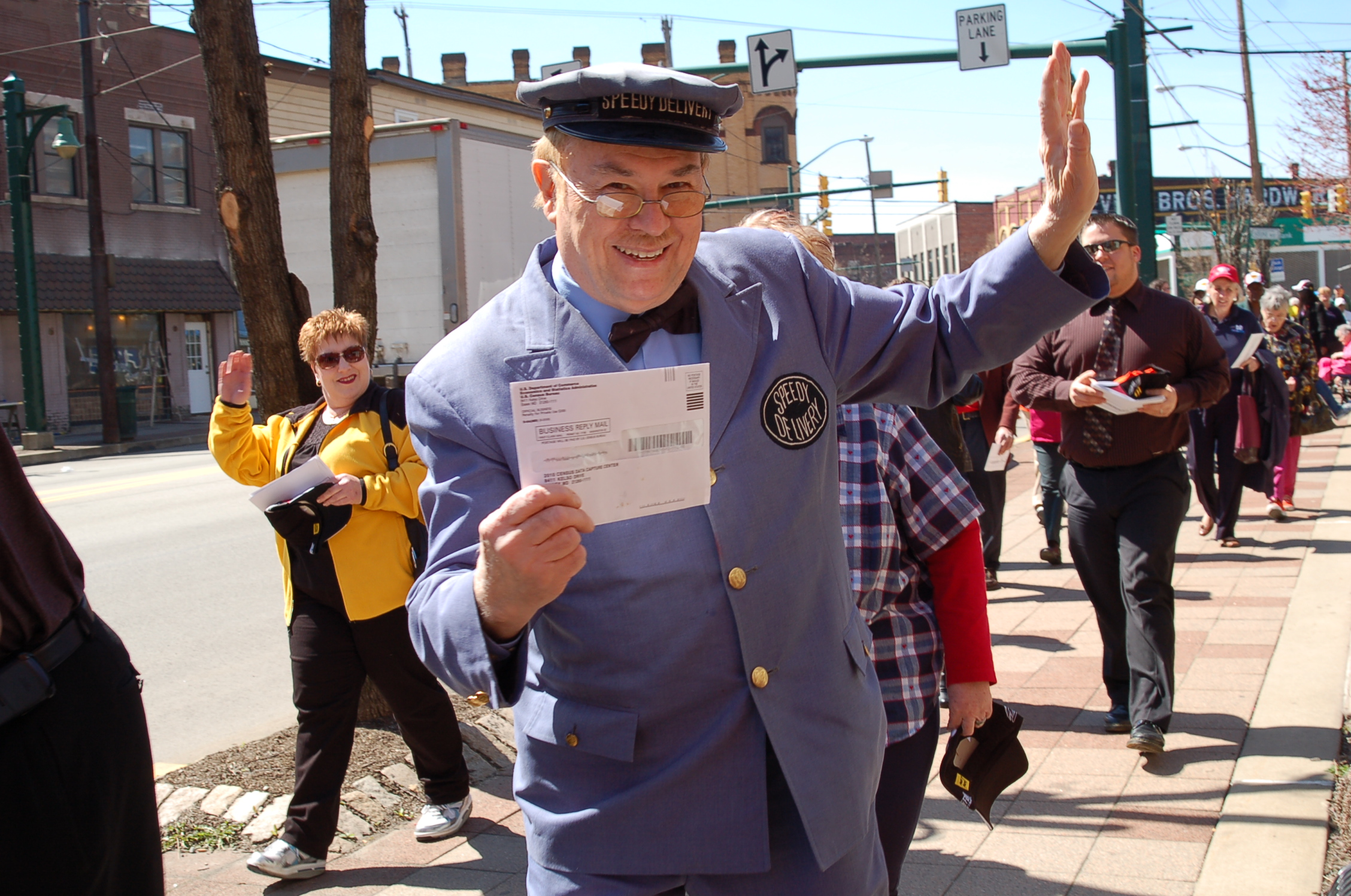
Mr. McFeely ("Speedy Delivery") leads a group to the post office to hand-deliver their completed 2010 Census forms during the "Count Me In In 2010 Rally" in Homestead, Pennsylvania.

=== Mister Rogers' Neighborhood ===
Beside's Mister Rogers, characters on the series include:

- Neighbor Aber (portrayed by Chuck Aber) - A resident of Westwood who is an associate of Mayor Maggie and does a lot of odd jobs. His real-world counterpart also does odd jobs.
- Lady Aberlin (portrayed by Betty Aberlin) - The niece of King Friday XIII. Her real-world counterpart Betty is an actress who is the manager of Betty's Little Theater.
- Scientist Alder (portrayed by Bud Alder) - A scientist who offers his scientific expertise in the real world and the Neighborhood of Make-Believe in earlier episodes.
- Charles Appel - A teacher and magician who is a friend of Mr. Rogers'.
- Natalie Baker - The cousin of Joe Negri's and mother of Angela's and Reid's who is a piano teacher.
- Marilyn Barnett - The gym teacher at the neighborhood school.
- Chef Brockett (portrayed by Don Brockett) - A baker who owns Brocket's Bakery. His Neighborhood of Make-Believe counterpart assists Edgar Cooke in the kitchen. Brockett is shown to have a limp as he always reminds Fred to maintain the same pace when walking together.
- Bob Brown - A puppeteer and marionette maker who is co-proprietor of Bob's Marionette Theater which is next door to Mr. Rogers' house.
- Judy Brown - The wife of Bob and co-proprietor of Bob's Marionette Theater.
- Michael Brown - The son of Bob and Judy Brown.
- Tony Chiroldes - The proprietor of the shop "Tony's" which specializes in toys, books, and costumes.
- Jose Cisneros - An employee at Brocket's Bakery and cousin of Gladys Schenk's who operates the counter and soda shop. He started working at Brocket Bakery after Gladys had a baby.
- Officer Clemmons (portrayed by François Clemmons) - A police officer who is a trained opera singer. One episode had him and Fred Rogers using an portable wading pool to do a foot bath because of the color barrier at the time.
- Dr. David Crippens - The neighborhood doctor.
- Keith David - In the Neighborhood of Make-Believe, he is a carpenter who lives in Southwood. His real-world counterpart appears in episode 1514 where he collects the money from the Donkey Kong arcade game at Brockett's Bakery.
- Emily the Poetry Lady (portrayed by Emily Jacobson) - A poet who appeared in early episodes.
- Joey Hollingsworth - A tap dancer who shares his talents in the "real" world and the Neighborhood of Make-Believe.
- Pilot Ito (portrayed by Yoshi Ito) - An opera singer who serves as the royal pilot of King Friday XIII's.
- Susan Linn - A local puppeteer who often makes up stories that involve Audrey Duck and Catalion at Betty's Little Theater.
- Mayor Maggie (portrayed by Maggie Stewart) - The Mayor of Westwood. Her real-world counterpart Maggie is an expert at sign language.
- Mr. David McFeely (portrayed by David Newell) - The delivery man for "Speedy Delivery" who was a frequent visitor to Mr. Rogers' house. He was named for Fred Rogers' maternal grandfather and his middle name.
- Mrs. Betsy McFeely (portrayed by Betsy Nadas) - The wife of Mr. McFeely's.
- Elsie Neal - A woman who operates the neighborhood craft and costume shop.
- Debbie Neal - The daughter of Elsie Neal's and an excellent singer who works at Negri's Music Shop.
- Handyman Negri (portrayed by Joe Negri) - A jazz-guitarist who has taught music at several Pittsburgh universities. His real world counterpart Joe operates the music shop called Negri's Music Shop on Rogers's street.
- Miss Paulificate (portrayed by Audrey Roth) - The royal telephone operator. Her real-world counterpart Audrey operates a janitorial service called Audrey Cleans Everything where her mobile home serves as her office.
- Sergio Pinto - An employer at Brockett's Bakery who runs the counter and would teach some Spanish words to Mr. Rogers.
- Mary Rawson - She shows interest in the theater and mimes at "Betty's Little Theater".
- John Reardon - An opera singer and frequent visitor of the Neighborhood of Make-Believe who helps its residents write and perform various operas.
- Gladys Schenk - A mother of two and an employee at Brockett's Bakery and cousin of Jose Cisneros's.
- Chrissy Thompson - The granddaughter of Mr. McFeely's and Mrs. McFeely's. She has spina bifida, which requires her to use leg braces and openly talks about it.
- Bob Trow - He runs Trow's Workshop where he works as a craftsman. It is at Trow's Workshop that Bob creates and fixes things for Mister Rogers and his fellow neighbors.
- Jewel Walker - A mime artist.

Only Mr. McFeely, Mrs. McFeely, Officer Clemmons, Scientist Adler, and Chef Brockett appeared substantially the same way in both Mr. Rogers' Neighborhood and the Neighborhood of Make-Believe.

=== Neighborhood of Make-Believe ===
The "Neighborhood of Make-Believe" is the fictional kingdom visited by Mr. Rogers during the show. Characters in the Neighborhood of Make-Believe were portrayed by both hand puppets and actors. Fred Rogers was the puppeteer for a great number of the characters:

- Collette
- Cornflake S. Pecially
- Daniel Striped Tiger
- Donkey Hodie
- Edgar Cooke
- Grandpere Tiger
- Henrietta Pussycat
- Ino A. Horse
- King Friday XIII
- Lady Elaine Fairchilde
- Mrs. Frogg
- Princess Margeret H. Lizard
- Queen Sara Saturday
- Tadpole Frogg
- X the Owl

Other characters and their performers or puppeteers:

- Anna Platypus
- Betty Okonak Templeton-Jones
- Bob Dog
- Cousin Mary Owl
- Cousin Steven Owl
- Dr. Duckbill Platypus
- Elsie Jean Platypus
- Harriett Elizabeth Cow
- H.J. Elephant III
- Hula Mouse
- James Michael Jones
- Prince Tuesday
- Purple Panda
- Robert Troll

In addition to Bob Trow, other regular puppeteers included Michael Horton, Lenny Meledandri (1980–2001), and Carole Switala.

Michael Keaton made his first television appearance as a volunteer in 1975. He played an acrobat in a troupe called The Flying Zookeenies that performed for King Friday's birthday and was also in charge of running the Trolley.

=== Operas ===
Thirteen in-series "operas" took place during the course of the series within the Make-Believe segments. Many of them featured American baritone John Reardon as a main character. The operas would encompass the entire episode and would be seen after a brief introduction by Mr. Rogers.

1. Babysitter Opera (1968)
2. Campsite Opera (1968)
3. Teddy Bear/Whaling Ship Opera (1969)
4. "Pineapples and Tomatoes" (1970)
5. "Monkey's Uncle" (1971)
6. "Snow People and Warm Pussycat" (1972)
7. "Potato Bugs and Cows" (1973)
8. "All in the Laundry" (1974)
9. "Key to Otherland" (1975)
10. "Windstorm in Bubbleland" (1980)
11. "Spoon Mountain" (1982)
12. "A Granddad for Daniel" (1984)
13. "A Star for Kitty" (1986)

Additionally, a play, Josephine The Short-Necked Giraffe, first aired in 1989 as a tribute to the late John Reardon.

=== Guests ===
Guests on the series ranged from cellist Yo-Yo Ma to actor and bodybuilder Lou Ferrigno of TV's The Incredible Hulk (in a 2001 piece where celebrities were asked about their heroes, Rogers cited Ma as one of his heroes). A 1968 visit by electronic music pioneer Bruce Haack resurfaced in the 2004 documentary Haack: King of Techno.

Guests on Mister Rogers' Neighborhood were often surprised to find that, although Rogers was just as gentle and patient in life as on television, he was nevertheless a perfectionist who did not allow "shoddy" ad-libbing; he believed that children were thoughtful people who deserved programming as good as anything produced for adults on television.

Rogers appeared as a guest on some other series. On the children's animated cartoon series Arthur, for example, Rogers plays himself as an aardvark like Arthur. Later on, Arthur appears as a guest in hand-puppet form in a 1999 episode of Mister Rogers' Neighborhood in the Neighborhood of Make-Believe. Bill Nye, host of a science-themed program, and Rogers also exchanged appearances on each other's series, as did Rogers and Captain Kangaroo. Rogers additionally appeared in an episode of Sesame Street, where he explains to Big Bird that, even if one loses a running race such as the one Big Bird had run against his friend "Snuffy", hard feelings threaten to break the two of them apart. Big Bird himself also appeared in one episode of Mister Rogers' Neighborhood in the Neighborhood of Make-Believe, when he came to deliver his entry to the "Draw the Neighborhood" art contest.

== Funding ==
Rogers testifies before the Senate Subcommittee on Communications on May 1, 1969, explaining how his series was funded and convincing senators to further fund PBS's predecessor NET.

- N.E.T. affiliated stations children's program fund (1968–1970)
- The Sears-Roebuck Foundation (1968–1976, 1979–1992)
- Corporation for Public Broadcasting (1971–1976, 1991–2001)
- Office of Education (1974–1975)
- Bureau of Education for the Handicapped (1975)
- Ford Foundation (1975–1976)
- Johnson & Johnson (1975–1976)
- Public Television Stations / "contributions to your PBS station from Viewers Like You" (1975–1976, 1979–2001)

The Ford Foundation, Public Television Stations and Johnson & Johnson also provided funding for repeats of the 1969-1975 color episodes, beginning in 1976.

== After the series ==
When Fred Rogers died in 2003, PBS's website provided suggestions to parents on how to respond to children who ask about Rogers' death.

Beginning on September 3, 2007, some PBS affiliates began replacing the show with new programs such as Super Why!, WordGirl and WordWorld. In June 2008, PBS announced that, beginning in late 2008, the network would stop broadcasting Mister Rogers' Neighborhood as part of its daily syndication lineup to member stations, instead airing the program only once a week over the weekend. Milwaukee PBS, for example, still carries the show once a week, on Sunday, over its primary HD/SD channel. Beginning on September 1, 2008, Mister Rogers was replaced by new programming such as Martha Speaks, Sid the Science Kid, and an update of The Electric Company. However, individual member stations have the option of airing Mister Rogers independently of the PBS syndicated feed, with series home WQED in particular continuing to air the series daily until 2010. There was a campaign in 2008 and 2009 to urge PBS and all member stations to bring the show back seven days a week. The premiere of the Daniel Tiger's Neighborhood spin-off in 2012 effectively ended most reruns of the show for several years, but, by 2017, some stations began to bring back a selected number of episodes. As of 2023, reruns air on many PBS stations early in the morning on Saturdays and Sundays.

To celebrate the 50th anniversary of the series' national premiere, PBS aired selected episodes of Mister Rogers' Neighborhood for a week in February 2018.

=== Spin-offs ===
In July 2011, during the annual Television Critics Association summer press tour, it was announced that a new animated spin-off series, Daniel Tiger's Neighborhood, was in production. The show debuted on most PBS stations on September 3, 2012. The series features Daniel Tiger, the four-year-old son of Daniel Striped Tiger, as a host of the series, which also features characters of the Neighborhood of Make-Believe all grown older, with the children now having families of their own.

A second spin-off titled Donkey Hodie, focusing on the titular character, aired on PBS May 3, 2021. The puppet series features a radically different design for the character along with his friends Purple Panda, Duck Duck and Bob Dog, as they learn and sing through the land of "Someplace Else".

== Music and regular songs ==
=== Regular songs ===
The song "Won't You Be My Neighbor?" was written by Fred Rogers in 1967 and was used as the opening theme for each episode of the show.

In the first three seasons of the show, during which new episodes were constantly being produced, each show ended with the song "Tomorrow", which was written by Rogers' former colleague, Josie Carey. Starting with Season 4 in 1971, "Tomorrow" was used only on Monday through Thursday episodes, and a new closing song, which is titled as "The Weekend Song", was used only on Friday episodes as the program would not return until Monday.

Eventually, the "Tomorrow" song was removed entirely due to copyright issues, and by 1973, Rogers sang "It's Such a Good Feeling" at the end of each episode. Prior to 1973, the original version of "It's Such a Good Feeling" was used as part of Mister Rogers' general repertoire of songs. When "It's Such a Good Feeling" became the closing theme for Mister Rogers' Neighborhood in 1973, it used a rewrite of "The Weekend Song" at the end, using only the first four lines: "And I'll be back when the day is new, and I'll have more ideas for you. And you'll have things you'll want to talk about; I will too". This was only used on Monday through Thursday episodes. On Friday episodes, the lyric was changed to "week" instead of "day". On early episodes of this season, the line was originally written as "When tomorrow is new".

=== Music ===
Musical directors for the series include:

- Johnny Costa (1968–96)
- Michael Moricz, who took over as music director after Costa's death and served until the end of the series in 2001.

In addition to arranging and directing the music heard on Mister Rogers' Neighborhood, Costa, along with other musicians, performed almost all the background music heard on the series, including the show's recognizable main theme, the trolley whistle, Mr. McFeeley's frenetic speedy delivery piano plonks, the vibraphone flute-toots (played on a synthesizer) as Fred fed his fish, dreamy celesta lines, incidental music, and Rogers' entrance and exit tunes. Each day an episode was recorded, Costa and his ensemble played live in the studio for the filming. Musicians who played in this ensemble were:

- Johnny Costa – Piano, Celesta, Synthesizer, & Trolley Whistle
- Joe Negri – Guitar
- Carl McVicker Jr. – Bass Guitar, Double Bass
- Bobby Rawsthorne – Drums & Percussion

Even after Costa's death in 1996, much of the music heard on the program continued to be Costa's, and his name continued to be listed in the show's closing credits as one of its musical directors.

== Broadcast history ==
The first broadcast of Mister Rogers' Neighborhood was on the National Educational Television network on February 19, 1968; the color NET logo appeared on a model building at the beginning and end of Mister Rogers' Neighborhood from 1969 to 1970. When NET ceased operations, the series moved its successor network PBS, even though episodes up until the end of the fourth season in May 1971 were still copyrighted by and produced for NET.

The series' first season (1968) consisted of 130 episodes, produced in black-and-white. For seasons 2–8 (1969–75), the show produced 65 new color episodes each year. By the end of season 8, this meant there was a library of 455 color episodes that could be repeated indefinitely. Rogers and the rest of the show's cast and crew began suffering burnout from taping 65 episodes a year and, in 1975, Rogers made the decision to take a break from the series for a few years. As a consequence, season 9 (1976) consisted of only five episodes. These five new episodes (which aired the final week of original episodes of the so-called "first series") featured Mister Rogers in his workshop, watching scenes of past episodes of his series, which he recorded on videocassettes and kept on the shelf in his workshop. On the Friday episode of that week (February 20, 1976), he reminded viewers that they, too, could watch many of those old episodes beginning the following week. During the hiatus period, two primetime episodes were produced and aired as specials: a Christmas show in December 1977 and a "springtime"-themed show.

In 1978, production of the series resumed, with an eye towards "freshening up" the show by producing 15 new episodes per year. These "second series" episodes, which began airing in August 1979, would be mixed in with the already-airing cycle of repeats from the so-called "first series" (i.e., the color episodes of seasons 2–9, aired from 1969 to 1976).

The series aired 15 new episodes annually between 1979 and 1993. As well, there were occasional "Mister Rogers Talks with Parents About..." specials, which featured panelists discussing ways in which parents could talk to their children about the issues discussed on Mister Rogers' Neighborhood. These specials usually were aired on weekends, just prior to the airing of a new batch of Monday-to-Friday episodes.

Beginning in 1994, the production schedule varied the number of episodes produced per season, with 10 episodes aired in season 24 (1994) and season 25 (1995). As of August 11, 1995, the episodes from the "first series" (1968–76) were withdrawn from the repeat schedule, since there were over 200 "second series" episodes available for broadcast, and many of the first series episodes had become outdated. Season 26 (1995–96) consisted of 20 episodes, season 27 (1997) produced 10 episodes, seasons 28 and 29 (1998–99) both contained 15 episodes, and season 30 (2000) reverted to 10 episodes. The final season, season 31 (2001), consisted of only 5 episodes, centering on the theme "Celebrate The Arts".

A few episodes from the "first series" are available for viewing in the Paley Center for Media, including the first episode of the series and the first color episode. A complete collection of episodes, including more than 900 videotapes and scripts from the show along with other promotional materials produced by Rogers or his Family Communications Inc. production company, exists in the Mister Rogers' Neighborhood Archives, located in the Elizabeth Nesbitt Room at the University of Pittsburgh School of Computing and Information Building.

=== Reruns ===
When PBS began re-airing the first 460 color episodes of the series in 1976, some of the earliest color episodes from 1969 and 1970 were re-edited with new voice-overs or footage. For example, in one 1970 episode where Mister Rogers demonstrates the noise-proof ear protectors that airport workers use on the tarmac, the film footage used featured a worker directing a United Airlines jet with its stylized "U" logo—which was not introduced until 1974. All of the episodes revised from the first series also included an extra segment following the closing credits, mentioning the episode number and additional companies that provided funding since these episodes originally aired, even though they had not provided funding at the time of their original production. The episode numbers correlated to activity guides for parents, which included activities and discussion topics for parents and child care providers to utilize with their children. The black and white episodes of the first season were last re-run on August 21, 1970, just before NET was replaced by PBS.

As of 2013, almost all of the 1979–2001 "second series" episodes are still in active rotation on a number of PBS stations. The only exception is the week-long "Conflict" series (episodes #1521–#1525), first aired during the week of November 7–11, 1983. The series/story arc covered the topics of war, bombs, and an arms race, and was created in response to the Invasion of Grenada, and the 1983 Beirut barracks bombings. The "Conflict" series was last aired on PBS during the week of April 1–5, 1996.

Only a few episodes of the series have been released to DVD by Anchor Bay Entertainment, although some earlier compilation-based releases were issued on VHS by Playhouse Video during the mid-1980s. 100 episodes have subsequently been released as part of Amazon Video. A DVD set titled the It's a Beautiful Day Collection, containing 30 episodes from the second series, was released on March 27, 2018, by PBS.

==== Twitch marathons ====
On May 11, 2017, streaming video platform Twitch announced with The Fred Rogers Company that 886 episodes of Mister Rogers' Neighborhood would be streamed live on the Internet over an 18-day period (although several episodes were skipped over during the marathon, most notably the 1983 "Conflict" episodes). The marathon began on May 15, 2017, at noon PT and ended on June 3, 2017. The marathon included many Mister Rogers episodes that had only aired once before. During the live stream, viewers were encouraged to support their local PBS station.

Mister Rogers' Neighborhood joined other popular PBS shows, including The Joy of Painting and The French Chef, that have been streamed on the Twitch service.

On March 20, 2018, Twitch began streaming a 90-episode marathon to commemorate Rogers' 90th birthday, followed by a repeat marathon of the series.

=== International broadcast ===
In the Canadian province of Ontario, the show was broadcast on TVOntario from 1970 to 1989. These broadcasts could also be seen in U.S. cities close to Canadian border.

=== Digital platforms ===
In late May 2024, it was announced that online streaming platform Pluto TV would be creating a dedicated 24/7 channel for Mister Rogers Neighborhood as the program was available already on-demand. On June 10, the channel was launched. The show is also among the shows broadcast by the free streaming channel PBS Retro launched in April 2024.

== Episodes ==
Season	Episodes	Originally released		
Season	Episodes	First released	Last released	Network
1	130	February 19, 1968	August 16, 1968	NET
2	65	February 10, 1969	May 9, 1969	NET
3	65	February 2, 1970	May 1, 1970	NET
4	65	February 15, 1971	May 14, 1971	PBS
5	65	February 21, 1972	May 19, 1972	PBS
6	65	February 19, 1973	May 18, 1973	PBS
7	65	February 18, 1974	May 17, 1974	PBS
8	65	February 17, 1975	May 16, 1975	PBS
9	5	February 16, 1976	February 20, 1976	PBS
10	15	August 27, 1979	May 23, 1980	PBS
11	15	February 16, 1981	July 24, 1981	PBS
12	15	March 1, 1982	July 2, 1982	PBS
13	15	November 15, 1982	April 29, 1983	PBS
14	15	November 7, 1983	May 11, 1984	PBS
15	15	November 19, 1984	May 17, 1985	PBS
16	15	November 25, 1985	May 9, 1986	PBS
17	15	November 24, 1986	May 8, 1987	PBS
18	15	November 23, 1987	May 6, 1988	PBS
19	15	November 21, 1988	May 5, 1989	PBS
20	15	November 20, 1989	August 3, 1990	PBS
21	15	November 19, 1990	August 30, 1991	PBS
22	15	November 25, 1991	August 28, 1992	PBS
23	15	November 23, 1992	September 3, 1993	PBS
24	10	February 21, 1994	September 2, 1994	PBS
25	10	February 20, 1995	September 1, 1995	PBS
26	20	October 16, 1995	August 30, 1996	PBS
27	10	February 17, 1997	August 29, 1997	PBS
28	15	February 16, 1998	August 28, 1998	PBS
29	15	February 15, 1999	August 27, 1999	PBS
30	10	February 21, 2000	September 1, 2000	PBS
31	5	August 27, 2001	August 31, 2001	PBS
Specials	17	June 7, 1968	September 13, 1994	NET (special 1), PBS (specials 2–17)

== Specials ==
A prime time Christmas special, Christmastime with Mister Rogers, first aired in 1977. This special had François Clemmons introducing a storyteller and flutist friend to Rogers. They filmed several narrated segments of the stories François' friend told. The special also had the Neighborhood of Make-Believe segment which shows how they celebrated Christmas. The trolley had a banner on the roof that said "Merry Christmas" on one side, and "Happy Hannukah" on the other. This special was aired every Christmas season until 1982. This special's opening has Rogers walking through a real neighborhood while the titles roll rather than the model neighborhood used in the series.

In 1994, Rogers created another one-time special for PBS called Fred Rogers' Heroes which consisted of documentary portraits of four real-life people whose work helped make their communities better. Rogers, uncharacteristically dressed in a suit and tie, hosted in wraparound segments that did not use the "Neighborhood" set.

For a time, Rogers produced specials for the parents as a precursor to the subject of the week on the Neighborhood called "Mister Rogers Talks To Parents About [topic]". Rogers did not host those specials, though; other people like Joan Lunden, who hosted the "Conflict" special, and other news announcers played MC duties in front of a gallery of parents while Rogers answered questions from them. These specials were made to prepare the parents for any questions the children might ask after watching the episodes on that topic of the week.

=== Mister Rogers: It's You I Like ===
On March 6, 2018, a primetime special commemorating the 50th anniversary of the series aired on PBS, hosted by actor Michael Keaton. The hour-long special also features interviews by musician Yo-Yo Ma, musician Itzhak Perlman, actress Sarah Silverman, actress Whoopi Goldberg, actor John Lithgow, screenwriter Judd Apatow, actor David Newell, producer Ellen Doherty, and spouse Joanne Byrd Rogers, as well as clips of memorable moments from the show, such as Rogers visiting Koko the gorilla, Margaret Hamilton dressing up as The Wizard of Oz's Wicked Witch of the West, and Jeff Erlanger in his wheelchair singing "It's You I Like" with Rogers.

Earlier PBS specials include Our Neighbor, Fred Rogers in 1990 and Fred Rogers: America's Favorite Neighbor in 2003. A short special, Mister Rogers in Our Neighborhood by PBS station WUCF, described Fred Rogers's college years and family connections in Florida.

== Tributes ==
Over the years, many television shows, exhibits and attractions have been named in tribute to Mister Rogers' Neighborhood. After three years as a traveling exhibit, the Children's Museum of Pittsburgh had "Welcome to Mister Rogers' Neighborhood" installed as a permanent exhibit in 2004. The planetarium show "The Sky Above Mister Rogers' Neighborhood" is an animated adaptation of the television show for preschool-aged children. Idlewild and Soak Zone, an amusement park near Rogers' hometown of Latrobe, Pennsylvania has an attraction called "Mister Rogers' Neighborhood of Make-Believe" featuring a life-size trolley ride, designed by Rogers. This was shut down in 2014 to reopen as Daniel Tiger's Neighborhood in 2015. A children's play area at Monroeville Mall in the Pittsburgh suburb of Monroeville was named for the television show.

Many of the artifacts from the set of Mister Rogers' Neighborhood, including the tree of X the owl, the make-believe neighborhood and the inside entrance to Mister Rogers' home is on display at the Heinz History Center in Pittsburgh. Also included is a life-size figure of Mister Rogers and a sweater he wore on the show.

A kiosk containing artifacts used during the series is located on Concourse C of Pittsburgh International Airport, near the children's play area. The Mister Rogers' Neighborhood Archives at the University of Pittsburgh School of Computing and Information is an academic resource and collection that contains correspondence, scripts, props, puppets, fan mail, 911 tapes including all but four episodes of the series on 3/4-inch production videotape; plus one on VHS (three other episodes are not in the collection) along with various videos of specials, interviews and scholarly articles that show the cultural impact of Fred Rogers' work. A statue of Fred Rogers exists on the North Shore of the Allegheny River near Heinz Field at the surviving footing of the Manchester Bridge. The original trolley from the shows is on display at the Canadian Broadcasting Centre in Toronto, Ontario.

A documentary feature film about the series, titled Won't You Be My Neighbor?, was released by Focus Features on June 8, 2018. Another documentary, Mister Rogers & Me, was shown at film festivals in 2010 and on PBS stations in 2012. An American drama film, titled A Beautiful Day in the Neighborhood starring Tom Hanks as Rogers, was released on November 22, 2019, by TriStar Pictures.

On September 21, 2018, a Google Doodle was created in honor of Mr. Rogers.

In summer of 2023, a fan's Lego Ideas contest toy block creation of Mister Rogers' Neighborhood received some 10,000 supporters for an official project set. It advanced to the Sep. 2023 review phase but was turned down by the Lego Review Board in May 2024.

=== Music ===
The music of the show was interpreted by an eclectic mix of modern artists for the 2005 album Songs From the Neighborhood: The Music of Mister Rogers. The YouTube show Pittsburgh Dad uses a piano theme song inspired by the jazz music constantly heard on Mister Rogers' Neighborhood. The musical project Symphony of Science, in association with PBS Digital Studios, created a music video called "Garden of Your Mind" from clips of the show, using Rogers' own pitch-corrected spoken words to create a song.
