= Mister Rogers' Neighborhood season 28 =

Mister Rogers' Neighborhood
- Season 28
- No. of episodes: 15

Release
- Original network: PBS

Season chronology
- ← Previous; Season 27 Next → Season 29

The following is a list of episodes from the twenty-eighth season of the PBS series, Mister Rogers' Neighborhood, which aired between February and August 1998. The first broadcast of Mister Rogers' Neighborhood was on the National Educational Television network on February 19, 1968.

== Episode 1 (Giving and Receiving) ==
Rogers visits Eric Carle, author and illustrator of children's books. Mr. McFeely shows a videotape on how fortune cookies are made. A Spanish-speaking "Fortune Cookie Man" makes his debut in the Neighborhood of Make-Believe.

- Aired on February 16, 1998.

== Episode 2 (Giving and Receiving) ==
Saihou Njie gives Rogers a demonstration on making batik vests. Later in the program, Mr. McFeely shows a videotape on how bagels are made.

- Aired on February 17, 1998.

== Episode 3 (Giving and Receiving) ==
Rogers brings back The Potty Book that he had introduced back in 1989, and reads it in full, this time. Mr. McFeely shows a videotape of how toilets are made. Betty Okonak Templeton visits the Neighborhood of Make-Believe in search of Lady Elaine.

- Aired on February 18, 1998.

== Episode 4 (Giving and Receiving) ==
Rogers creates a simple merry-go-round from paper plates and a cardboard tube. Mr. McFeely shows a videotape on how carousel horses are made.

- Aired on February 19, 1998.

== Episode 5 (Giving and Receiving) ==
Rogers presents a gift for Mr. McFeely just as he delivers a book for guest LeVar Burton (the host of the PBS program Reading Rainbow) to read. In the Neighborhood of Make-Believe, the finder balloons reveal Lady Elaine and her friend in an obscure room of the Museum-Go-Round.

- Aired on February 20, 1998.

== Episode 6 (You and I Together) ==
Rogers sees people operating a lifting device that elevates a wheelchair into a van. In the Neighborhood of Make-Believe, King Friday commands Mayor Maggie, who had arrived in a wheelchair, to visit Dr. Bill Platypus for a clean bill of health.

- Aired on July 27, 1998.

== Episode 7 (You and I Together) ==
Rogers comforts a visit with Koko the Gorilla. No such warmth can be found in the Neighborhood of Make-Believe when a different gorilla visits. The lone exception is Lady Aberlin, who finds the gorilla tame.

- Aired on July 28, 1998.

== Episode 8 (You and I Together) ==
Rogers visits his eye doctor to have his vision checked. Mr. McFeely presents a video on how eyeglass lenses are made. Lady Elaine is bent on warning the Neighborhood of Make-Believe about the visiting gorilla.

- Aired on July 29, 1998.

== Episode 9 (You and I Together) ==
Rogers talks about how a variety of sticks is similar to a group of words: the more you have, the better you can work with them. Mr. McFeely shows a video of a service dog, named C.D., aiding a handicapped child. In the Neighborhood of Make-Believe, Dr. Bill Platypus tries to ensure Lady Elaine that the gorilla, called Kevin Wendell, is tame.

- Aired on July 30, 1998.

== Episode 10 (You and I Together) ==
In drawing a rainbow, Rogers points out the more colors, the better. He then reflects on a place where friends visit to play with toys. Lady Aberlin hints that Kevin Wendell Gorilla may not be a gorilla after all. Chuck aber shows a film on picture picture of how Heather And Heather driving a bumper car

- Aired on July 31, 1998.

== Episode 11 (Little and Big) ==
Prince Tuesday is a natural at working a yo-yo, much to King Friday's chagrin. To everyone's dismay, Friday disallows any yo-yos in the neighborhood.

- Aired on August 24, 1998.

== Episode 12 (Little and Big) ==
At an airport, Rogers sees Mr. McFeely about to make deliveries on a helicopter. In the Neighborhood of Make-Believe, Lady Aberlin and Miss Paulifficate are unwilling enforcers of King Friday's bar on yo-yos. This does not prevent Lady Elaine from flying a helicopter she has called "Yo-Yo". She flies up but does not come down.

- Aired on August 25, 1998.

== Episode 13 (Little and Big) ==
Lady Elaine is trying to send messages for her neighbors to get her down from her stuck helicopter. Unfortunately, Bob Dog grabs on her hat message and gets stuck himself. Mr. Rogers Watches How People Make Grape Jelly In The Factory On Picture Picture

- Aired on August 26, 1998.

== Episode 14 (Little and Big) ==
Mr. McFeely shows a videotape of his visit to inventor Chuck Hoberman. Rogers gets a visit from Mrs. McFeely. In the Neighborhood of Make-Believe, Handyman Negri rescues both Bob Dog and Lady Elaine. Rogers plays a cassette tape of cello music and reflects on Yo-Yo Ma and his son Nicholas.

- Aired on August 27, 1998.

== Episode 15 (Little and Big) ==
Rogers visits the studio apartment of an innovative architect. She explains how an appreciation of the earth inspired her to design certain tables, seats, and couches. Cornflake S. Pecially improves King Friday's mood with a "Royal Automated Yo-Yo". Further reason to repeal the "no yo-yos" rule comes from a videotape of Yo-Yo Ma.

- Aired on August 28, 1998.
