= Robert Hendy-Freegard =

Convicted British conman

- Born: Robert Freegard; 1 March 1971 (age 55); Dronfield, Derbyshire, England
- Other names: David Hendy, David Clifton
- Known for: Conman and impostor
- Criminal charges: Theft, deception and kidnapping-by-fraud (2005); kidnap conviction quashed on appeal (2007). Violence against public officials (2025)
- Criminal penalty: Life in prison (2005); reduced to 9 years on appeal (2007). 6 years in prison (2025)
- Criminal status: Incarcerated

Robert Hendy-Freegard (born Robert Freegard, 1 March 1971) is a British convicted conman and impostor who masqueraded as an MI5 agent, from his early 20s through his 30s, while working as a barman and car salesman. He is also known as David Hendy and David Clifton.

== Biography ==
Hendy-Freegard was born in Dronfield and started his career as a barman and car salesman. Hendy-Freegard met his victims on social occasions or as customers in the pub or car dealership where he worked. Having met the victims, he claimed to be an undercover agent, working for MI5, the Special Branch or for Scotland Yard. He applied pressure and psychological stress to his victims, claiming they were threatened with assassination by the IRA, to coerce them into following his demands.

Having won his victims over, he coerced money out of them and pressured them to do his bidding, by asking them to: cut off contact with their family and friends; perform "loyalty tests"; and live alone in poor conditions. He seduced five women, claiming that he wanted to marry them. Initially some of the victims refused to cooperate with the police because he had warned them that police would be double agents or MI5 agents performing another "loyalty test".

In 1992, while working in The Swan, a pub in Newport, Shropshire – and still with the unhyphenated name Freegard – he befriended two women, Sarah Smith and Maria Hendy, and a man, John Atkinson. All three were agriculture students at Harper Adams University in Edgmond. He told Atkinson that he was an MI5 undercover agent who was investigating an IRA cell in the college. He forced Atkinson to let himself be beaten up to prove his loyalty and to show that he was "hard enough". He also persuaded him to behave in a bizarre manner in college to prove his loyalty and to alienate him from friends. Hendy-Freegard then told Atkinson his cover was blown and both of them had to go undercover. He persuaded Atkinson to tell Smith, who at the time was Atkinson's girlfriend, and Hendy that he had liver cancer and persuaded them to accompany them in a "farewell tour" all over England.

Later he let them in on "the story". He told them to sever all contact with their families because they were in danger just through being associated with him. They moved to Sheffield and gave him all their money. Maria Hendy became his lover and gave birth to his two daughters; she was later beaten up by him losing one of her teeth. During their relationship he changed his surname by deed poll to Hendy-Freegard.

Next, in 1995, Hendy-Freegard had an affair with a recently married personal assistant, Elizabeth Bartholomew (née Richardson). He told her to take up loans, supposedly to settle her debts following her divorce, and then made her sleep on park benches.

In 1996, Hendy-Freegard told a woman in Newcastle, Lesley Gardner, that he needed money to buy off IRA killers, who had been released after the Good Friday agreement. She gave him £16,000 over six years. He also sold her car and again kept the money.

In 2000, Hendy-Freegard convinced a female company director, Renata Kister, that MI5 had told him to watch someone in the Sheffield car dealership where he was working and persuaded her to buy a better car. He sold her original car, kept the money and persuaded her to take out a £15,000 loan for him. He also asked Kister for a room for Sarah Smith because she was supposedly in a witness protection programme. He told her that Smith could not speak English, and told Smith that for security reasons she had to pretend that she could not understand anything said to her, so that the two women would not speak to each other.

In 2000, Hendy-Freegard met a lawyer, Caroline Cowper, who was a customer at a car dealership in Chiswick, West London. He helped her change her car, pocketed the difference, asked for more, persuaded her to give more money for a leasing business they would run together and stole £14,000 from her building society account. They later became lovers and went on holidays all over the world. They then became engaged before her family intervened. When the leasing car did not materialize, he told her that the Polish mafia had taken it.

In 2002, Hendy-Freegard seduced an American child psychologist, Kimberley Adams, with stories of how he had infiltrated a criminal network and killed a criminal who had threatened to expose him. He said he wanted to marry her, on condition that she would also become an agent and cut off the contact with her family.

In 2002, Scotland Yard and the Federal Bureau of Investigation (FBI) organized a sting operation with the help of Kimberley Adams' parents. First, the FBI bugged the phone of the parents. Adams' mother told Hendy-Freegard she would give him $10,000 but only in person. Hendy-Freegard met the mother at Heathrow Airport where police apprehended him.

On 23 June 2005, after an eight-month trial, Blackfriars Crown Court convicted Hendy-Freegard on two counts of kidnapping (John Atkinson and Sarah Smith), 10 of theft and eight of deception. On 6 September 2005, he was given a life sentence.

On 25 April 2007, it was reported that Hendy-Freegard had appealed against his kidnapping convictions. The Court of Appeal judgment played an important role in defining the modern offence of kidnap, holding that inducing a person to go from one place to another by fraud does not constitute kidnapping. His life sentence was revoked but he still faced nine years for the other offences. He was released in May 2009.

In 2011, using the name David Hendy, he met and seduced a British woman named Sandra Clifton through an online dating service. He claimed to work in the media industry selling advertising space to large companies, and often hinted at the amount of money he had, convincing Sandra of his wealth with expensive gifts and trips. It has been alleged that as their relationship developed over the course of the next few years, he gradually manipulated Sandra and her family members through deception, coercive control and mental abuse, progressively isolating Sandra from her family and friends. Hendy-Freegard has denied these claims. Sandra Clifton later ceased contact with her children Sophie and Jake, and with their father Mark Clifton.

It has been reported that Hendy-Freegard and Sandra Clifton have been working in the beagle breeding and showing business, and that he uses the name David Clifton. According to the Netflix documentary he lived and worked in France where he traded luxury dogs; however, more recent media suggests he lived in Reading, Berkshire.

On 26 August 2022, a British man, who the French media identified as Hendy-Freegard, caused severe injuries to two gendarmes in a hit-and-run after a Veterinary Health inspection of his dog breeding activities in Vidaillat, France. On 2 September, after being on the run for eight days, he was apprehended by the Dilbeek police in Groot-Bijgaarden (near Brussels) following the issuance of a European Arrest Warrant. He was travelling alone. On 3 September, he appeared before a Belgian magistrate and was detained pending his extradition to France. On 15 September, the Brussels council court authorised Hendy-Freegard's extradition to France. On 19 September, the prosecutor's office confirmed that he had appealed against the extradition. Hendy-Freegard was handed over to the French authorities on 17 October. He appeared before judges in Limoges on 20 October, when he was indicted for the alleged attempted murder of 'persons holding public authority' and held in pre-trial detention at the Limoges remand centre. At his trial at a court in Guéret in 2025, Hendy-Freegard was found guilty of the charge of 'violence against public officials with aggravating circumstances'. He was sentenced to 6 years in prison in February 2025.

== In popular culture ==
The Spy Who Stole My Life, a television documentary about Hendy-Freegard, was broadcast on Channel Five on 7 September 2005.

Hendy-Freegard was the subject of the January 2022 Netflix documentary mini-series The Puppet Master: Hunting the Ultimate Conman.

In July 2022, Netflix UK streamed the feature film Rogue Agent, with James Norton playing Hendy-Freegard.
