= Neighborhood of Make-Believe =

Fictional kingdom inhabited by hand puppet characters, created by Mr. Rogers

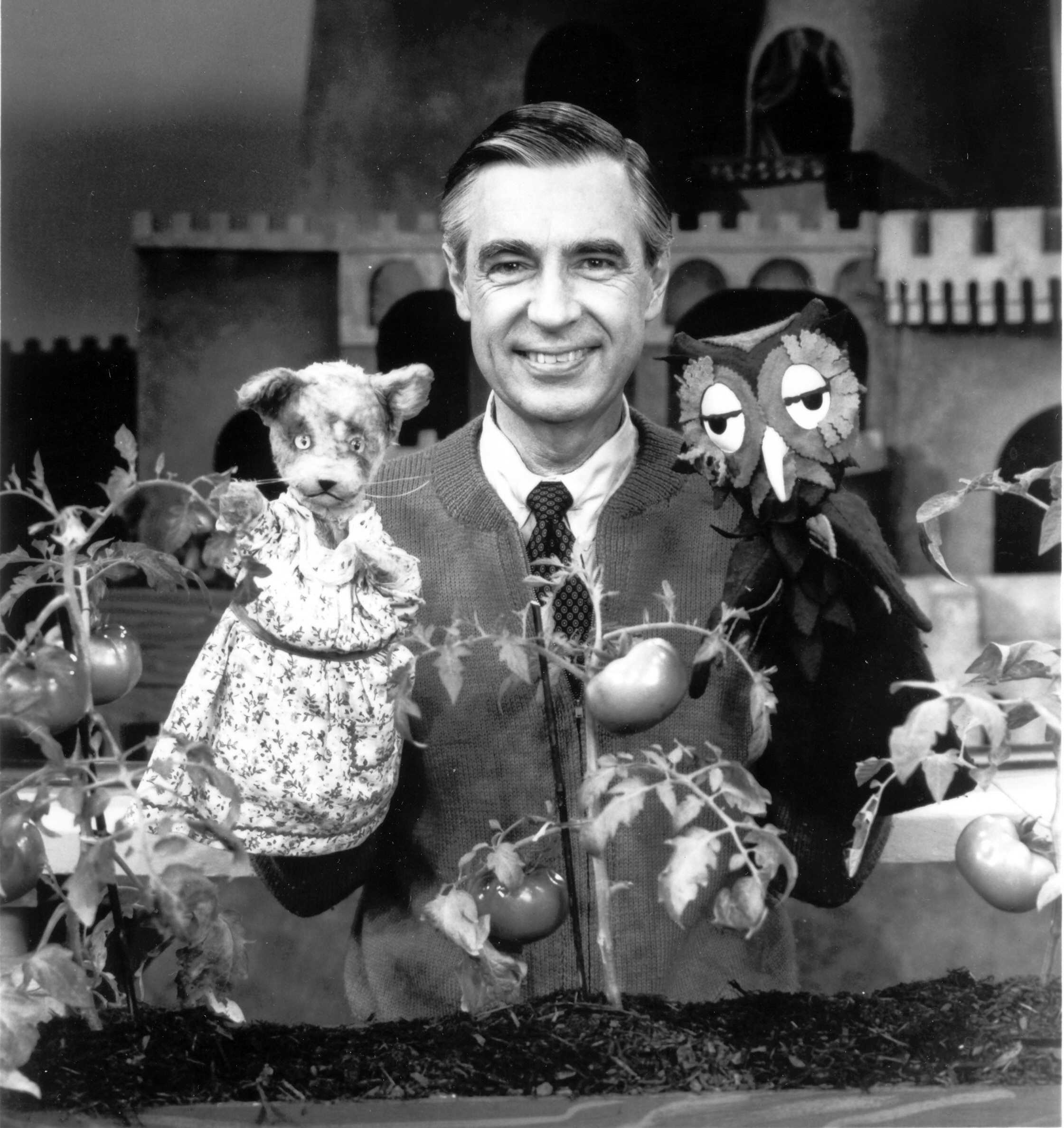
From left: Henrietta Pussycat, Fred Rogers, and X the Owl, in front of King Friday's Castle

The Neighborhood of Make-Believe is the fictional kingdom inhabited by hand puppet characters on the children's television series Mister Rogers' Neighborhood, which originally aired on PBS (and its predecessor NET) from 1968 to 2001, and its predecessor Mister Rogers, which originally aired on CBC from 1963 to 1966 with the name Neighbourhood of Make Believe. Principal puppeteer Fred Rogers developed many of the characters in the 1950s for Josie Carey's program The Children's Corner. Both shows were shot in Pittsburgh, Pennsylvania.

== Overview ==
The adventures of the Make-Believe Neighborhood citizens appear in a short segment once in the middle of almost every episode. Rogers deliberately makes the distinction between the real world and the Neighborhood of Make-Believe clear by transitioning in and out of the Neighborhood segment via a distinctive red and yellow model electric trolley that enters and exits through small tunnels in the wall. He occasionally sets up small tabletop models of the various Neighborhood of Make Believe buildings and discusses what had happened with his audience after the end of each segment. The same storyline continues for a week or more similar to that of a soap opera, though Rogers always recaps the plot for the audience as well.

== Characters ==
Characters in the Neighborhood of Make-Believe were portrayed by both hand puppets operated by puppeteers and on-screen actors. They would occasionally talk to the viewers in specific episodes.

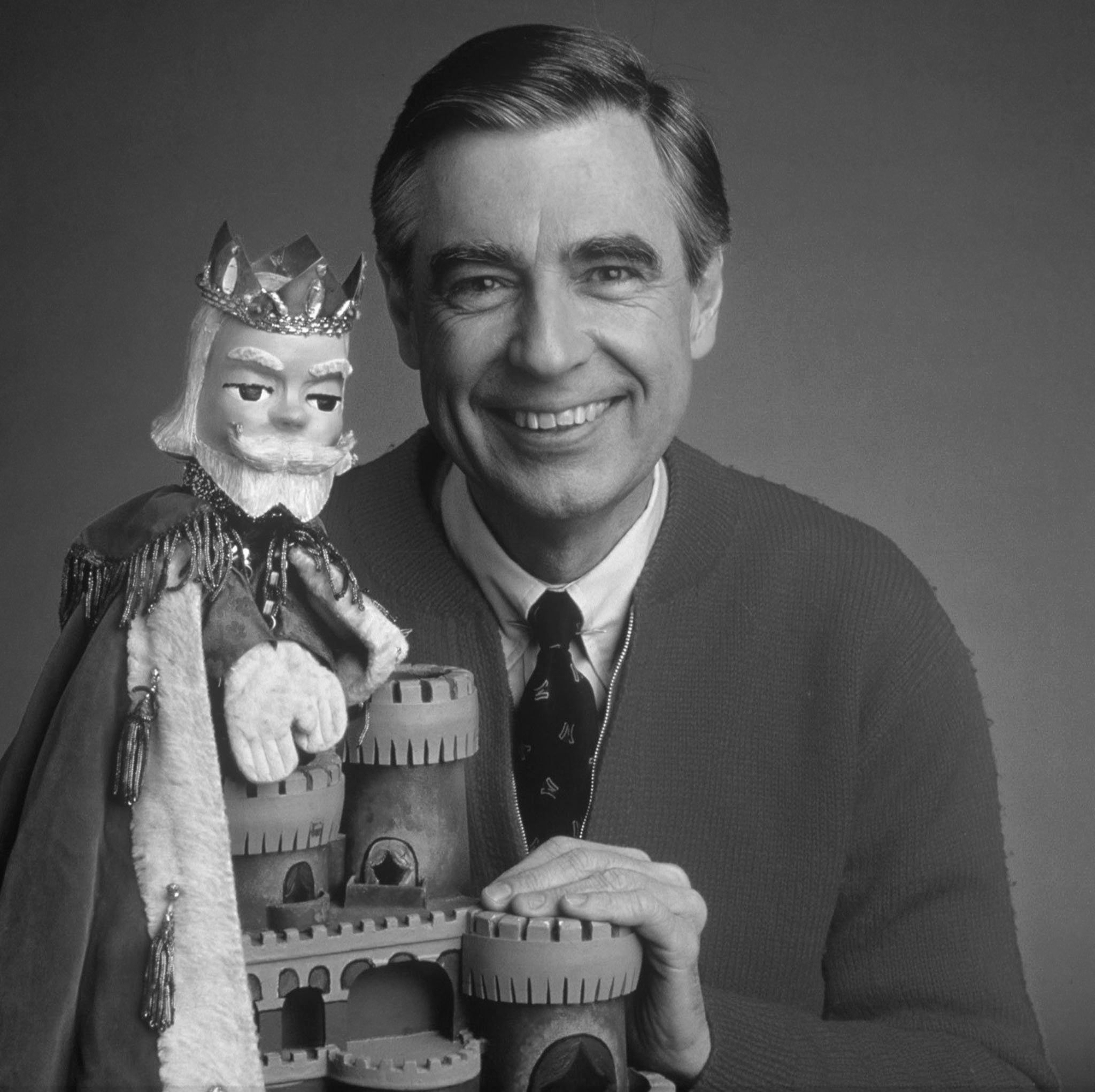
Fred Rogers and King Friday XIII

=== Regular puppets ===
The following characters are puppets:

- King Friday (performed by Fred Rogers in the original series, Matt Vogel in Donkey Hodie) – King Friday XIII is the imperious king of the neighborhood. He is relatively egocentric, irrational, resistant to change, and temperamental, although open-minded enough to listen when told he is wrong. He has a fondness for giving long-winded speeches and using big words. When meeting with someone, he would quote "[insert character name here], I presume." He or she would respond: "Correct as usual/always, King Friday." King Friday has two pet wooden birds named Troglodytes aedon and Mimus polyglottos (the scientific names, in genus and species, of the house wren and the northern mockingbird, respectively). Mimus appeared first in Episode #20 from 1968 and Troglodytes appeared in Episode #1285 from 1973. King Friday also uses big words for certain songs like "Twinkle Twinkle Little Star" and "Row, Row, Row Your Boat", which he refers to as "Royal versions". King Friday was the second puppet to appear on Children's Corner.
- Queen Sara Saturday (performed by Fred Rogers) – Queen Sara Saturday is King Friday's wife. She was first introduced as a commoner from Westwood on Episode #32 and the two married in Episode #1015. In the third-season episode #1117, they had a son named Prince Tuesday. Queen Sara is more rational and level-headed than her husband. She frequently mentions doing charity work for Food for the World. Queen Sara was named for and resembles Fred Rogers' wife, Sara Joanne Rogers.
- Prince Tuesday (performed by Adair Roth (pre-1979 seasons), Fred Michael (1979–1980), Charles Altman (1981–1986), briefly Carole Switala, Lenny Meledandri (1987–2001)) – Prince Tuesday is the son of King Friday and Queen Sara. Born in the third season (Episode #1117) and named for the day of the week when he was born, Prince Tuesday is one of only two characters to age during the course of the series (he starts as a baby, then a toddler; and from 1979 onward, he is elementary school-aged). He is curious and enthusiastic and attends the school in Someplace-Else.
- X the Owl (performed by Fred Rogers) – X the Owl lives in an old oak tree in the Neighborhood. He is eager and cheerful and has a strong desire to learn new things. Many of X's stories involve assignments from the Owl Correspondence School and he idolizes Benjamin Franklin. He also has trouble making decisions. X was the third puppet to appear on Children's Corner.
- Henrietta Pussycat (performed by Fred Rogers) – Henrietta Pussycat is X's neighbor and lives in a small yellow and orange school house supported by a strong limb on the tree. Early episodes established her as the governess of several nice mice, thus the schoolhouse. She has a habit of randomly inserting "meow" into her sentences due to being a cat. When she was first introduced, she could only say "beautiful", "telephone", and "Mister Rogers", in addition to "meow". She is anxious, preoccupied with beauty, and prone to jealousy. She also was the flower girl at Betty and James' wedding. She is the fourth puppet to appear on Children's Corner.
- Lady Elaine Fairchilde (performed by Fred Rogers) – Lady Elaine Fairchilde is an outspoken, cranky woman who moved to the Neighborhood from Someplace Else to run the Museum-Go-Round after the Froggs moved out in early 1969. Lady Elaine was often known to say "Okay, toots," and is generally the antagonist when a storyline calls for one. One of her prized possessions is her Boomerang-Toomerang-Zoomerang, with which she can turn the neighborhood upside-down. Although a frequent antagonist (hinted at times to hide possible insecurities), she is not portrayed as evil, but as someone who challenges authority, particularly King Friday's authority, as she often has rows with the king. She first appeared in Episode #5 of Mister Rogers' Neighborhood and is named after Fred's adopted sister.
- Daniel Stripèd Tiger (performed by Fred Rogers) – Daniel Stripèd Tiger is the first puppet ever to appear on Children's Corner and Mister Rogers' Neighborhood. He is a shy tiger who lives in a non-functioning grandfather clock with no hands, as it is whatever time can change in The Land Of Make-Believe. Despite his shyness, Daniel exhibits wisdom and intelligence when he does speak. His favorite toy is a small dump truck and he wears a watch on one arm because he lives in the clock and always has to know what time it is. He was the ring bearer for Betty and James's wedding. He was named after Dorothy Daniel, who gave Fred his first puppet. Daniel was the puppet most frequently brought along by Rogers for live performances and Rogers stated that Daniel represented certain aspects of his personality. In July 2011, PBS announced that Daniel's son (also named Daniel) would be the star of his own show Daniel Tiger's Neighborhood.
- Cornflake "Corney" S. Pecially (performed by Fred Rogers) – Cornflake S. Pecially is a beaver-like character who is the proprietor of a factory specializing in rocking chairs. His original factory caught fire and was damaged during the first season, and his neighbors pitched in to help him rebuild. Corney has also been known to produce dolls, pretzels, model trolleys, and other goods. He debuted on Mister Rogers, the precursor of Mister Rogers' Neighborhood. Corney's middle initial and last name are a play on the word "especially."
- Grandpere Tiger (performed by Fred Rogers) – His real name being "Henri Frederique de Tigre", Grandpere Tiger is a French tiger and bon-vivant who lives to the left of the castle in the Eiffel Tower. He has a very kind heart and often donates the use of the tower to his neighbors whenever they ask.
- Collette Tiger (performed by Fred Rogers) - Collete is Grandpère's granddaughter who lives in France and appears in 1971 and 1984. At first, Henrietta Pussycat becomes jealous of Collette because of her beauty. In time, they become good friends.
- The Frogg Family – The Frogg Family are a family of frogs who were the original curators of the Museum-Go-Round. The family is made up of Dr. Frank Lee Frogg who works as a pediatrician, Mrs. Frogg, and their son Tadpole. The family moved to Westwood during the first color week of the series and were only seen infrequently after that.
- The Platypus Family – The Platypus Family are duck-billed platypuses who live in a mound. It consists of Dr. Bill Platypus (performed by Bill Barker in a Scottish accent), his wife Elsie Jean Platypus (also performed by Bill Barker) and their daughter Ornithorhynchus Anatinus (Ana) Platypus (the Latin scientific name for a platypus) (performed by Carole Muller Switala). Along with Prince Tuesday, she is one of two puppet characters to age during the series. Ana has four grandparents: Grandma Nell Platypus, Grandpa Tom Platypus (maternal), Nana Platypus and Dada Platypus (paternal). Dr. Bill works at the Eiffel Tower where Grandpère lives and plays the bagpipes. "Doc Bill" plays on the word "duck-bill."
- Harriet Elizabeth Cow (performed by Bob Trow in the original series, Stephanie D'Abruzzo in Donkey Hodie) – Harriet Elizabeth Cow is a teacher and Donkey Hodie's co-worker in Someplace-Else. She played the organ for Betty and James' wedding and is named after Fred Rogers' aunt.
- Edgar Cooke (performed by Fred Rogers) – Edgar Cooke is the royal chef of the castle who sings everything he says, per King Friday's request for a "singing chef"
- H.J. Elephant III (performed by Chuck Aber) – H.J. Elephant III is an African elephant who is one of Prince Tuesday's friends.
- Betty Okonak Templeton-Jones (performed by Michael Horton) – Betty Okonak Templeton-Jones is the longtime friend of Lady Elaine who occasionally comes to visit from Southwood. She was a widow until marrying James Michael Jones.
- James Michael Jones (performed by Michael Horton) – James Michael Jones is Betty Okonak Templeton-Jones's second husband. James is a resident of Glassland where he did "Exactly Like Me" portraits (which are really mirrors).
- Carrie Dell Okonak Templeton-Jones – Known as "Carrie Dell" for short, Carrie Dell Okonak Templeton-Jones is the adopted daughter of James Michael Jones and Betty Okonak Templeton-Jones.
- Old Goat (performed by Tom Megalis in the first storyline, Michael Horton in the second storyline) – Old Goat is a goat resident of Northwood and speaks only in "goat sounds".
- New Goat (performed by Sara Locklard) - New Goat is a goat resident of Northwood and can translate for Old Goat.
- Donkey Hodie (performed by Fred Rogers in the original series, David Rudman in Donkey Hodie) - Donkey Hodie is a donkey that lives in Someplace Else with Harriet Elizabeth Cow and operates a Washer Dryer Sorter Dumper there. Originally, Donkey Hodie came to the Neighborhood of Make-Believe to build a windmill, but King Friday didn't like having it so close to the castle. At the scientific advice of Scientist Adler, Donkey Hodie relocated to Someplace Else. The name "Donkey Hodie" is a pun of the name of Don Quixote, and the windmill storyline is a spoof of Don Quixote's penchant for tilting at windmills. Donkey Hodie has a series which aired on May 3, 2021 and was redesigned as a more modern felt-faced puppet. The titular character from Donkey Hodie is the granddaughter of the original Donkey Hodie and the original Donkey Hodie is referred as Grampy Hodie.
- Hilda Dingleboarder (performed by Barbara Russell) - An employee at Corney's factory. She once invented a recycling machine when the Neighborhood of Make-Believe faced a garbage crisis.
- Yo-Yo LaBelle (performed by Michael Horton) - An alien from the stars. All he can say is "Mee" and "Thee." Only Daniel Striped Tiger can understand what Yo-Yo LaBelle is saying.
- Audrey Duck (performed by Susan Linn) - A duck who is an occasional visitor to the Neighborhood of Make-Believe.
- Catalion (performed by Susan Linn) - A lion who is an occasional visitor to the Neighborhood of Make-Believe and is a friend of Audrey Duck.
- Mr. Skunk (performed by Chuck Aber) - A striped skunk who lives in Westwood and occasionally visits the Neighborhood of Make-Believe. As he is insecure, he tends to spray when nervous or startled.
- Neighborhood Trolley – A small, red, sentient electric trolley that enters and exits the Neighborhood of Make-Believe, taking the viewers of the show with it. Known simply as "Trolley", it communicates through the uses of its whistle of a steam locomotive and bell and occasionally moves backwards and forwards to get the other characters' attention or to show that it is getting impatient, and a musical melody is usually heard every time the Trolley moves along its tracks. It can go both fast and slow. Also, when lifted from the tracks, it can show pictures from the past, as revealed in the episodes "Then and Now".
- Arthur Timothy Read (performed by Michael Yarmush) was a guest puppet. He is an aardvark from Elwood City who appeared in "Go Stop Go".

=== Live characters ===
These characters, some in costumes, are much larger than the puppet characters and sometimes help the puppets with tasks such as lifting or moving large objects, which the small puppet characters are unable to do. Some of these live characters include:

- Lady Aberlin (portrayed by Betty Aberlin) – King Friday's niece and frequently the "main" character of the segments. Often the only full-sized character in the neighborhood segments, she acts as something of a level-headed older sister to the puppets and audience alike, and an audience surrogate, providing exposition for the story's narrative. She can occasionally be seen dancing around the Neighborhood whenever she's by herself. Sometimes nicknamed Lady A, she was one of Betty's brides-maids along with Lady Elaine for Betty and James' wedding. She also sometimes acts as a surrogate mother to Daniel Tiger, as, unlike Prince Tuesday or Ana Platypus, he has no parental figures, but attends school with them. She is the daughter of King Friday's older sister Claire, and her cousins are Prince Tuesday, as well as the sons of Friday's younger brother Paul (these include Nicky, Qwentin, Paulie and Kevin). After Prince Tuesday, and the sons of King Friday's brother, Lady Aberlin is next in line for the throne of the kingdom.
- Mr. McFeely (portrayed by David Newell) – The "Speedy Delivery" delivery man. He sometimes delivers letters and packages to the citizens of the Neighborhood of Make-Believe. Generally if a package from OCS (Owl Correspondence School) is being delivered to X the Owl, Mr. McFeely delivers it. He is one of a few characters to pass between Mr. Rogers' "real" world and the Neighborhood of Make-Believe.
- Handyman Negri (portrayed by Joe Negri) – The friendly, avuncular neighborhood handyman. Played the guitar. However, he was also originally known as Joe Negri in the early days of the Neighborhood of Make-Believe.
- Bob Dog (portrayed by Bob Trow in the original series, performed by David Rudman in Donkey Hodie) – A friendly, playful dog. Bob Dog is enthusiastic about many things, a trait which sometimes gets him into trouble. Becomes an "adopted cousin" for Ana Platypus. In Donkey Hodie, Bog Dog is depicted as a hand puppet.
- Chef Brockett (portrayed by Don Brockett) – A baker who sometimes helps Edgar Cooke. He is one of the few characters to exist in both Mr. Rogers' "real" world and the Neighborhood of Make-Believe.
- Officer Clemmons (portrayed by François Clemmons) – A police officer who sometimes helps out King Friday in the Neighborhood of Make-Believe. Officer Clemmons regularly finds time to contribute to the many Neighborhood plays and operas. He once served as a professor for the Owl Correspondence School teaching a class in Early American Owl History. Officer Clemmons is one of the few characters to exist in both Mr. Rogers' "real" world and the Neighborhood of Make-Believe.
- Scientist Alder (portrayed by Bud Alder) - A scientist who offered his scientific expertise to Donkey Hodie. He is one of a few characters to exist in Mr. Rogers' "real" world and the Neighborhood of Make-Believe.
- Mr. Appel - A struggling magician who sells magician equipment. He is one of a few characters to exist in Mr. Rogers' "real" world and the Neighborhood of Make-Believe.
- Pilot Ito (portrayed by Yoshi Ito) - A pilot. After first appearing as herself and singing regularly for King Friday and his family, she later delivered King Friday's new airplane and was hired as the royal pilot. A talented opera singer who usually sang with Francois Clemmons in the "real" world, she appeared in three of the Neighborhood operas (twice as herself, once as Pilot Ito).
- Robert Troll (portrayed by Bob Trow) – The gibberish-speaking whimsical troll who is the friend of the castle. Robert Troll has many hidden talents as he is an artist, and is good at understanding things in nature. He is sometimes called "Robertroll". Robert Troll is a pun on his actor Robert Trow.
- Miss Paulificate (portrayed by Audrey Roth) – The telephone operator at the Castle. Storylines often allude to her former career as a dancer and she often demonstrates her tap-dancing abilities. She frequently takes the brunt of King Friday's bad moods.
- Nurse Miller (portrayed by Maxine Miller) - A nurse who works for Dr. Frogg.
- Mayor Maggie (portrayed by Maggie Stewart) – The Mayor of Westwood, a democracy bordering the Neighborhood of Make-Believe. She was introduced in the 1970s to show that women can run for mayor too. By contrast, the Neighborhood of Make-Believe is a monarchy, the throne of which is inherited by male-preference primogeniture. She is fluent in sign language. Despite being a leader of similar stature to the King, she is frequently roped into doing his bidding.
- Charles R. Aber: Westwood Neighbor (portrayed by Chuck Aber) – Also known as Neighbor Aber, he is the associate of Mayor Maggie of Westwood. During the course of the series, he also holds the position of a Clown T-shirt salesman, delivery man, and pilot. It is revealed that he is divorced and doesn't get to see his kids much. Despite living in Westwood, Aber is a frequent character in the Neighborhood of Make-Believe from 1981 to the end. In episode 1727 to episode 1730, Aber once posed as Kevin Wendell Gorilla to see how people would treat him if he wasn't himself.
- Mr. Anybody (portrayed by Don Francks) - A character in the earlier episodes who can take on any role. He was present when the Platypus Family moved into the Neighborhood of Make-Believe and was responsible for giving Trolley his whistle.
- Hula Mouse (portrayed by Tony Chiroldes) – A Spanish-speaking mouse who can do anything with his hula hoop. Called H.M. for short and has been heard to sing in English.
- Cousin Mary Owl (portrayed by Mary Rawson) – X the Owl's cousin who is a green and yellow owl. She also attended OCS (Owl Correspondence School) and enjoys videography. X notes that Mary lives in a sycamore tree. Cousin Mary can write in "short wing," which is similar to short hand.
- Cousin Stephen Owl (portrayed by Stephen Lee) – X the Owl's cousin.
- Keith David (portrayed by Keith David) – A carpenter from Southwood and unofficial "uncle" to Carrie Dell. He was James' best-man at his wedding.
- Digger Digorum (portrayed by Anna Haworth) - A regular visitor to the Neighborhood of Make-Believe who is King Friday XIII's teacher.
- Mr. Lloyd Allmine (portrayed by Bert Lloyd) – A man who took Daniel's clock, claiming he owned it (along with anything he wanted, hence his name). He returned in several other episodes, having reformed into a nicer character and running a museum of his collection.
- Ellen Paterson (portrayed by Zelda Pulliam) – The owner of Paterson Pools and Paterson Pipes.
  - Beaver O'Day (portrayed by Jim Beard) – A beaver who is Ellen's partner.
- Reardon (portrayed by John Reardon) – A real-life opera baritone, Reardon comes to the Neighborhood to help produce and perform in the 13 "mini-operas".
- Purple Panda (performed by David L. Nohling in 1973–1991, Matt Meko in 1996–2000, Frankie Cordero in Donkey Hodie) – A two-toned purple-colored full-bodied giant panda from Planet Purple with a robotic, monotone voice. He arrives in the neighborhood by teleporting, which is "The Purple Way to travel". He often carries a large bowl for his favorite dish, tapioca pudding. The Purple Panda that appears in Donkey Hodie is depicted as a hand puppet and is friends with the titular character.
  - Little Panda (performed by Liz Rossi) – A smaller full-bodied giant panda that is also from Planet Purple. His abilities appear similar to Purple Panda and he speaks in a similar monotonous voice.
- Randy S. Caribou (performed by Chuck Aber) – A caribou who wanted to hide from Chef Brockett after accidentally squashing a cake decorated to look like a soccer ball. He was played by Chuck Aber during the Fun and Games week of episodes.
- Big Bird (performed by Caroll Spinney) – Big Bird was a special guest on the show in one episode when he came to deliver his entry to the "Draw the Neighborhood" art contest. Henrietta became jealous of Big Bird, because she assumed he would be a better friend to X.
- Dr. Marchl (portrayed by William Marchl) - A doctor who knows everything.

== Geography ==
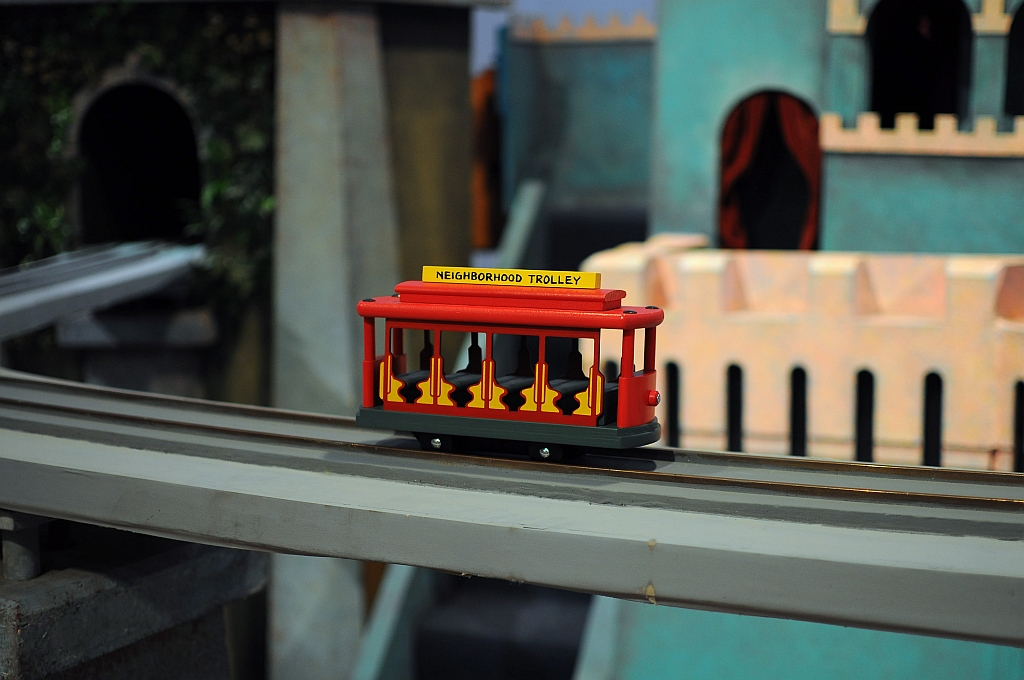
The Neighborhood Trolley on the route to King Friday's Castle

The Land of Make-Believe was staged with a theatrical set design, landmarks include (from left to right):

- Eiffel Tower – The only structure located left of the Castle; dark green and blue with red railing. There is also a red flashing light on top. Grandpere Tiger lives here. Its name and appearance is based on the real Eiffel Tower in Paris.
- King Friday's Castle – This is usually the first location seen in the Land of Make Believe as Trolley enters from a tunnel on its left side. Three different castles were featured in the show. For the first 27 episodes (in black and white), the castle was a very small (and presumably blue-colored as were the two forthcoming castles) two-tier structure with two archways in the lower tier and one archway in the combined square/round tower at the top. A television antennae was mounted in one of the square tower's front corners. On March 27, 1968, a larger castle was debuted without advance notice. This was also a two-tier structure with two archways in each and one polygonal tower at the top. A gold XIII plate was mounted on the front panel of the upper walkway. A new service entrance archway for employees and guests was built to the castle's right on the other side of the trolley tracks where it remained for the rest of the series. On February 27, 1969, the day before King Friday married Queen Sara Saturday, Lady Elaine used her boomerang and Handyman Negri played Brahms' Second Symphony on his guitar to magically change the old castle into a newer, even larger castle as their wedding gift to the royal couple. This became the well-known castle used for the remainder of the series: three-tier structure with seven archways; two in the lower tier, three in the center, and one in each of the two round towers at the top. The gold XIII was now under the second tier's widest archway where King Friday and Queen Sara came out to greet visitors. A carpeted exterior staircase was added to the left. A decorative waterfall/fountain was installed in front of the left side in 1971; King Friday would donate the waterfall to the people of Westwood many years later.
- Trolley Bridge/Tracks – There are two trolley routes in the Neighborhood. One is the usual route taken by the Neighborhood Trolley which is a concrete bridge that runs in front of the castle, entering the Neighborhood from the "real" world via tunnel on the left of the castle and running to the right tunnel next to the Castle's service entrance (and vice versa when it was time to return to the "real" world). The original trolley bridge for the first 27 episodes of the series ran a circular alignment to the original structure which castle guests had to cross under. When the castle was enlarged in the middle of the first season, the bridge was extended, widened and modified to make it easier for castle guests to cross under. A second route was occasionally used in which the Trolley ran past the other residences in the Neighborhood.
- Tele-can – The neighborhood can-and-string phone was originally located in a booth adjacent to the Rocking Chair Factory and Great Oak Tree. The booth was later reconstructed into a cage suspended in air and moved in front of the castle trolley tracks. Whenever anyone needed to make a call (via Miss Paulificate, the castle operator), he or she would stand under the cage, look up and signal for the cage to come down.
- Rocking Chair Factory – Located to the right of the Castle service entrance. Cornflake S. Pecially lives and works here. The original structure consisted of lights, dials and meters and a wide open tier at the top where Corny greeted and talked to his friends and customers. There was also a storage box to the left of the main structure. On May 15, 1968, the factory was destroyed by an accidental fire in the boiler room. Two days later, a new larger factory was completed. This was a pink colored structure (not revealed to TV viewers until the first color episode on February 10, 1969) with "Rockit" in script lettering and new blinking lights, dials and meters. Additional features included a revolving gear wheel and a display case with three rocking chairs.
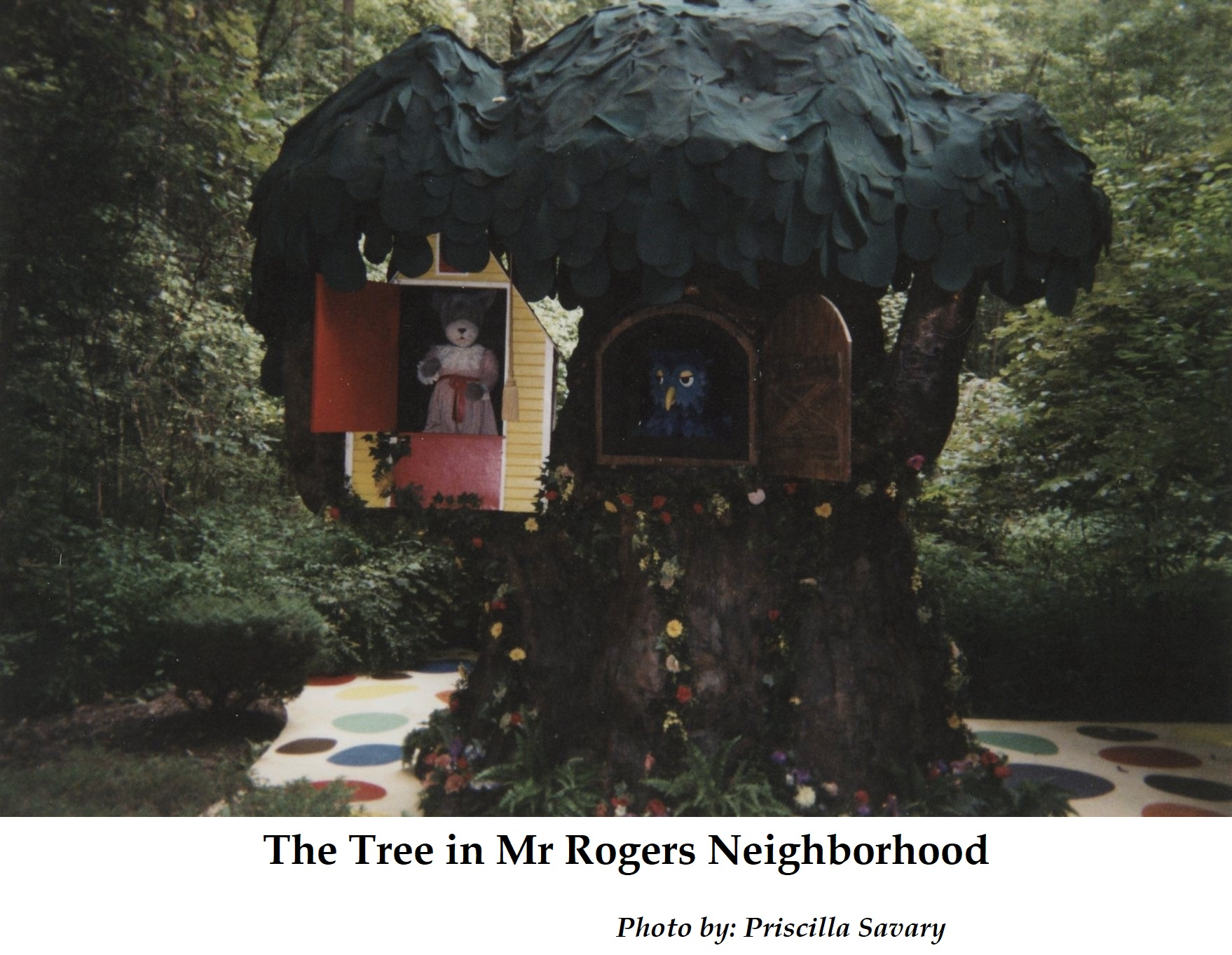
  The Great Oak Tree, housing Henrietta and X
- Great Oak Tree – Located in the center of the neighborhood, it is residence to Henrietta Pussycat, who lives in a small yellow schoolhouse-shaped structure with red double doors and a yellow bell within the branches of the tree, as well as to X the Owl, whose home is entered through an orange door with crossbeams on its inside originally shaped like a "Z". On February 19, 1969, at X's request to coincide with his name, Handyman Negri installed two wooden blocks within the crossbeams, giving it its well-known "X" shape.
- Museum-Go-Round – A revolving round, grey structure with grey pillars, originally owned and operated by the Frogg Family. On February 10, 1969, Mr. Frogg accepted a position with the zoo in Westwood, prompting the family to find a new owner for the museum before moving from the Neighborhood of Make Believe. A couple of days later, Lady Elaine Fairchilde (then a resident of Someplace Else) impressed Mrs. Frogg with her knowledge of the museum and eagerness to become its new curator. Mrs. Frogg's recommendation of Lady Elaine was passed by King Friday and the Frogg Family made their transfer to Westwood. On February 18, Lady Elaine moved into her new residence and installed a new red bell outside. The next day, she painted the pillars various colors with an assist from Lady Aberlin. Like the castle, The Museum seems to have an endless number of rooms, frequently designated by letters (e.g. dinosaurs are in the "D" room).
- Frog Pond – A stone pond resembling a fountain where Dr. and Mrs. Frogg and their son, Tadpole, lived before moving to Westwood. This was removed after the first week of color episodes and replaced by the Platypus Mound.
- Platypus Mound – A mound with six holes, which replaced the Frog Pond when the Platypus Family moved to the neighborhood.
- Grandfather Clock – An orange structure in the shape of a clock with a white flower pendulum, knocker, and yellow face without hands. Daniel Striped Tiger lives here. This is the outermost structure on the neighborhood set, and characters are never shown venturing beyond it.

=== Bordering regions ===
The world of the Land of Make-Believe also features several other "regions." Along with King Friday's realm, there are also bordering territories including:

- The City of Westwood – West of the Neighborhood, half-a-day's walk from The Neighborhood of Make Believe and quarter-a-day's walk from Someplace Else. According to Mr. Aber, the region didn't have enough water supply for a swimming pool, and enlisted the help of The Land of Make-Believe. The former Miss Sara Saturday was a resident of Westwood prior to her marriage to His Majesty King Friday XIII and her concurrent ennoblement as Queen Consort.
- The City of Southwood – South of the Neighborhood where Betty and James live.
- The Area of Northwood – Northwood is considered goat country and is north of the Neighborhood.
- Someplace Else – North of the neighborhood and south of Northwood where Donkey Hodie and Harriet Cow live. Located here is the schoolhouse where Daniel, Ana Platypus, and Prince Tuesday are students. The setting of the show Donkey Hodie.
- Land of Allmine – Lloyd Allmine's home. It was later turned into a museum.

=== Planet Purple ===
Characters also frequently interact with the inhabitants of Planet Purple, where everything and everyone are purple and exactly the same. Every girl on Planet Purple is named "Pauline" and every boy is named "Paul." Purple Panda, a resident of Planet Purple, can return there "the purple way" (just by thinking). Moreover, all of the planet's inhabitants speak monotonously, often intoning, "We are people from the planet purple." Inhabitants of Planet Purple are forbidden to sit in rocking chairs and, if they do, they are not allowed to return home. In one visit to the Neighborhood, Purple Panda sits in one of Cornflake S. Pecially's rocking chairs. However, with the help of the rest of the Neighbors, it is agreed that sitting in rocking chairs is an acceptable activity for all people, and Purple Panda is allowed to return home. Planet Purple was discovered by Lady Elaine Fairchilde.

== Theatrical productions ==
During the course of the series, the people and puppets in the Neighborhood of Make-Believe produced 13 "operas", with the assistance of John Reardon, and a play. These stories were told to the viewers by Fred Rogers.

=== Operas ===
The 13 operas are known as:

- Babysitter Opera (1968)
- Campsite Opera (1968)
- The Lost and Found Teddy Bear (1969)
- Pineapples and Tomatoes (1970)
- The Uncle of the Monkey (1971)
- The Snow People (1972)
- Potato Bugs and Cows (1973)
- All in the Laundry (1974)
- Key to Otherland (1975)
- Windstorm in Bubbleland (1980)
- Spoon Mountain (1982)
- A Granddad for Daniel (1984)
- A Star for Kitty (1986)

=== Play ===
There was one play that was done in the series that featured the people and puppets in the Neighborhood of Make-Believe:

- Josephine the Short-Necked Giraffe (1989)

== Spin-offs ==
=== Daniel Tiger's Neighborhood ===
In July 2011, at the annual Television Critics Association summer press tour, PBS announced the production of a Mister Rogers' Neighborhood animated spinoff, which debuted on the network in Fall 2012. Daniel Tiger's Neighborhood is hosted by Daniel Tiger (son of Daniel Stripèd Tiger) and features Neighborhood of Make-Believe characters as adults with families of their own.

=== Donkey Hodie ===
In January 2020, it was announced that a puppet spinoff of the series called Donkey Hodie was greenlit and would premiere in early 2021. The series would be crafted by Spiffy Pictures creators David & Adam Rudman and Todd Hannart. On January 27, 2021, it was confirmed that the series would launch on May 3 of that year and the series' logo, website, and theme song were revealed.
