= The Puppet Master: Hunting the Ultimate Conman =

2022 British television docuseries

- Genre: Docu-series
- Directed by: Sam Benstead; Gareth Johnson
- Country of origin: United Kingdom
- Original language: English
- No. of seasons: 1
- No. of episodes: 3

Production
- Cinematography: Paul O'Callaghan
- Editor: Julian Hart
- Production company: RAW

Original release
- Network: Netflix
- Release: 18 January 2022

The Puppet Master: Hunting the Ultimate Conman is a 2022 British Netflix docuseries directed by Sam Benstead and Gareth Johnson. The three-part series follows the search for British conman Robert Hendy-Freegard, and details how he masked his true identity in order to steal money from a multitude of different people for more than two decades. The series was released on 18 January 2022.

== Reception ==
The series gained generally positive reviews. The Guardian praised the series as "unbelievable and unforgettable" and gave it four stars. The Independent gave the series three stars and opined that the show is "a deft but incomplete story of unbelievable deception".
