= Betty Aberlin =

American actress (born 1942)

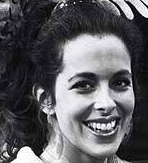
- Aberlin in 1980
- Born: Betty Kay Ageloff; December 30, 1942 (age 83); New York City, U.S.
- Education: Bennington College
- Occupations: Actress; poet; writer
- Years active: 1954–present
- Known for: Playing Lady Aberlin on Mister Rogers' Neighborhood

Betty Aberlin (born Betty Kay Ageloff; December 30, 1942) is an American actress, poet, and writer. She is best known for playing Lady Aberlin on the children's television series Mister Rogers' Neighborhood, a role she played for the entirety of the show's 33-year run.

== Personal life ==
Betty Kay Ageloff was born in New York City. Aberlin grew up in a Jewish family. She attended public schools in Queens and Staten Island. In Staten Island, she attended Curtis High School, graduating in 1959. She graduated from Bennington College, having studied art, modern dance, and literature with Howard Nemerov and Bernard Malamud.

== Career ==
She made her debut at the Phoenix Theatre in 1954 in Sandhog, a folk-opera by Waldo Salt and Earl Robinson.

Aberlin had a regular role as Lady Aberlin for 33 years on the children's television series Mister Rogers' Neighborhood. Lady Aberlin was King Friday's niece and frequently the "main" character of the Neighborhood of Make-Believe segments. Often the only human non-puppet character in the segments, she acted as something of a level-headed older sister to the puppet characters and audience alike, and an audience surrogate, providing exposition for the story's narrative. She could occasionally be seen dancing around the Neighborhood whenever she was by herself. Sometimes nicknamed "Lady A", she also sometimes acted as a surrogate mother to Daniel Stripèd Tiger. In a memorable episode from June 7, 1968 (just two days after the Robert F. Kennedy shooting), Daniel asks Lady Aberlin about the word assassination after his balloon deflated.

She also appeared on The Smothers Brothers Show (1975) and in various TV spots. For a short time she did a late-night radio show on WYEP-FM in Pittsburgh, a non-commercial, community-supported station she helped found. The program featured jazz, comedy, and some spoken arts and poetry. Aberlin wrote and performed a sequence for ACRE TV's The 90's—"Stop Me Before I Love Again"—in a theme show on growing older, which aired on PBS.

Aberlin played back-up singer Cheryl and later starred as Heather in the 1978 Joseph Papp production of Cryer & Ford's I'm Getting My Act Together and Taking it on the Road at the New York Shakespeare Festival's Public Theater in New York and on the road.

In 1980–1981, Aberlin played Meryl Streep's sister in Elizabeth Swados' Alice in Concert, based on Alice in Wonderland, both at The Public Theater and in a 1982 television version, Alice at the Palace.

Later in her career, Aberlin formed a friendship with filmmaker Kevin Smith and appeared in six of his films, including Dogma (1999), Jersey Girl (2004), Zack and Miri Make a Porno (2008), Red State (2011), and The 4:30 Movie (2024).

=== Writings ===
In 2005, Aberlin contributed the essay "The Blonding of America" to the literary web site Fresh Yarn . In the essay, she comments on privilege and physical appearance. The point of departure for her reflection is the purchase of a blonde wig to hide her first gray hairs. Wearing the wig, Aberlin is aware of how it erases racial or ethnic features and how her new look evokes a more glamorous feminine stereotype. She observes how this change to her appearance effects a change of consciousness: "I put [the wig] on, and I don't even notice the homeless anymore." She concludes the essay: "Later on that evening, I saw a yellow school bus, filled with Chasidim. On the sooty back window of the bus, someone had drawn a swastika. I'll tell you...it certainly feels a little safer....being blonde."

In 2008, Aberlin published a collection of poems, The White Page Poems, as a companion to A Book of Strife, in the Form of the Diary of an Old Soul, an 1880 collection of poems by George MacDonald. The original edition of MacDonald's book had a blank page opposite each poem.

== In popular culture ==
Musician Jonathan Coulton wrote the song "Lady Aberlin's Muumuu" about Aberlin's Mister Rogers character.
