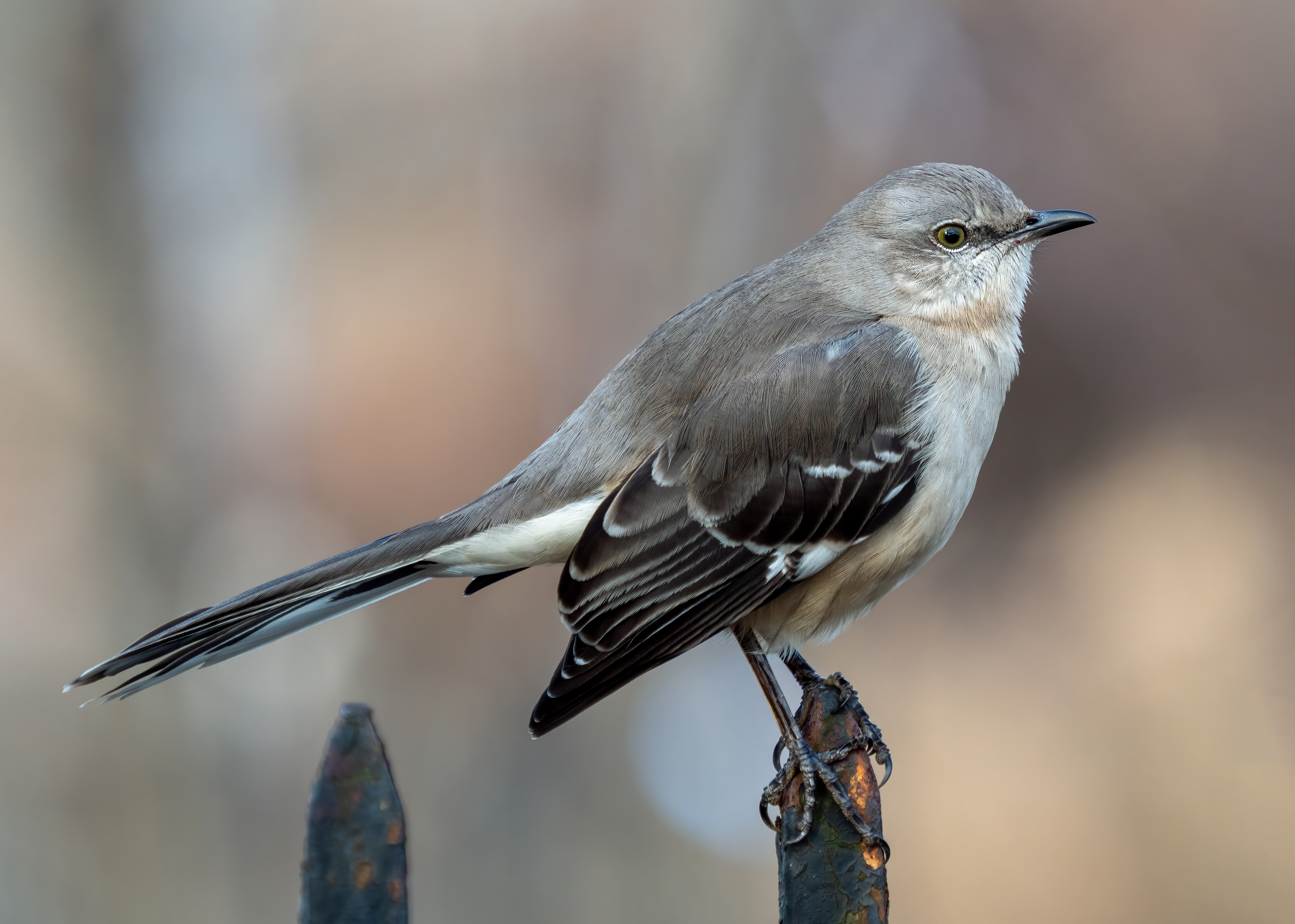
- An adult in New York City

Conservation status
- Least Concern (IUCN 3.1)

Scientific classification
- Kingdom: Animalia
- Phylum: Chordata
- Class: Aves
- Order: Passeriformes
- Family: Mimidae
- Genus: Mimus
- Species: M. polyglottos

Binomial name
- Mimus polyglottos (Linnaeus, 1758)
- Northern mockingbird range Breeding summer visitor Breeding resident Non-breeding winter visitor

Synonyms
- Turdus polyglottos Linnaeus, 1758

= Northern mockingbird =

Species of bird

The northern mockingbird (Mimus polyglottos) is a mockingbird commonly found in North America, of the family Mimidae. The species is also found in some parts of the Caribbean, as well as on the Hawaiian Islands. It is typically a permanent resident across much of its range, but northern mockingbirds may move farther south during inclement weather or prior to the onset of winter. The northern mockingbird has gray to brown upper feathers and a paler belly. Its tail and wings have white patches which are visible in flight.

The species is known for its ability to mimic bird calls and other types of sound, including artificial and electronic noises. Studies have shown its ability to identify individual humans and treat them differently based on learned threat assessments. It is an omnivore and consumes fruit, invertebrates, and small vertebrates. It is often found in open areas, open woodlands and forest edges, and is quite common in urbanized areas. The species breeds from southeastern Canada throughout the United States to the Greater Antilles. It is listed as a species of least concern by the International Union for Conservation of Nature.

The mockingbird is influential in United States culture, being the state bird of five states, appearing in book titles, songs and lullabies, and making other appearances in popular culture.

== Taxonomy ==
Swedish zoologist Carl Linnaeus first described this species in his Systema Naturae in 1758 as a species of thrush, Turdus polyglottos. Its current genus name, Mimus, is Latin for "mimic" and the specific polyglottos, is from Ancient Greek poluglottos, "harmonious", from polus, "many", and glossa, "tongue", representing its outstanding ability to mimic various sounds.

The closest living relative of the northern mockingbird is the tropical mockingbird (Mimus gilvus); the two form a superspecies, and occasional hybrids have been recorded where they overlap in Oaxaca and Veracruz in southeast Mexico.

=== Subspecies ===
There are three recognized subspecies for the northern mockingbird. There have been proposed races from the Bahamas and Haiti placed under the orpheus section.

- M. p. polyglottos (Linnaeus, 1758): generally found in the eastern portion of North America ranging from Nova Scotia to Nebraska, to as far south as Texas and Florida.
- M. p. leucopterus, the western mockingbird (Vigors, 1839): generally found in the western portion of North America ranging from northwestern Nebraska and western Texas to the Pacific coast, and south to Mexico (the Isthmus of Tehuantepec), and Socorro Island. It is larger than M. p. polyglottos and has a slightly shorter tail, upperparts are more buff and paler, underparts have a stronger buff pigment.
- M. p. orpheus (Linnaeus, 1758) from the Bahamas to the Greater Antilles, also the Cayman and Virgin Islands. Similar to M. m. polyglottos except smaller, a paler shade of gray on its back, and underparts with practically little, if any buff at all.
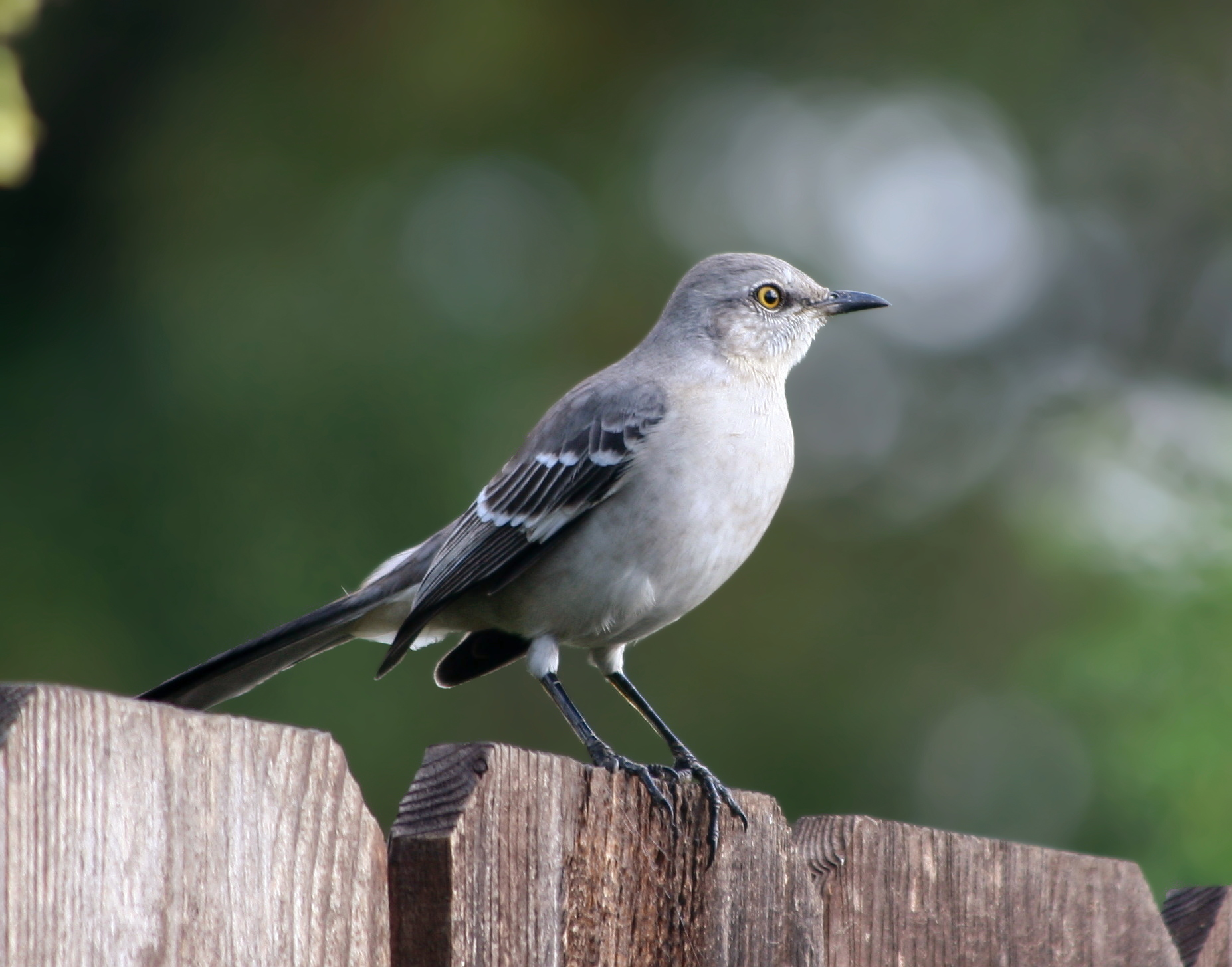
M. p. leucopterus in California

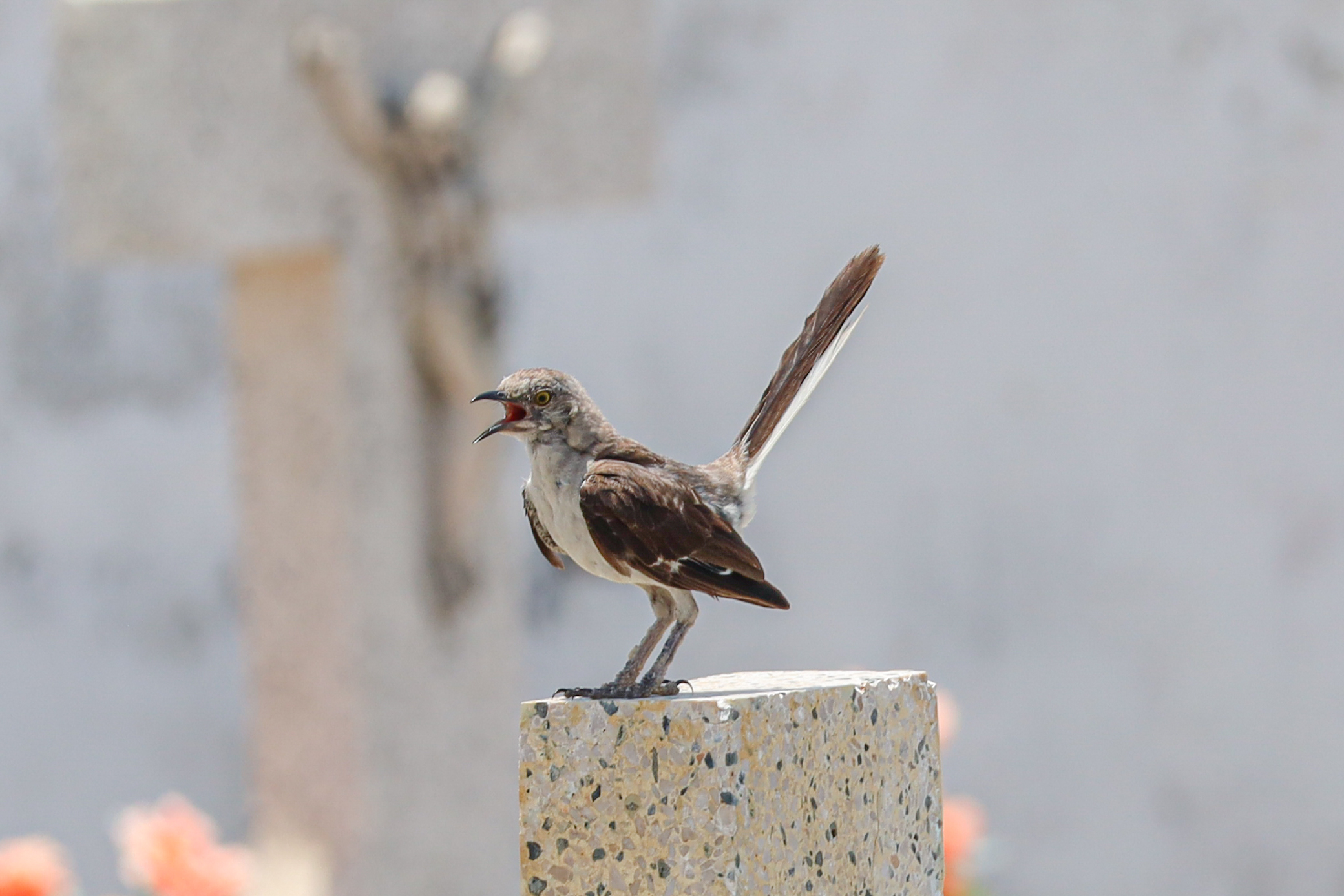
M. p. orpheus in Puerto Rico

== Description ==
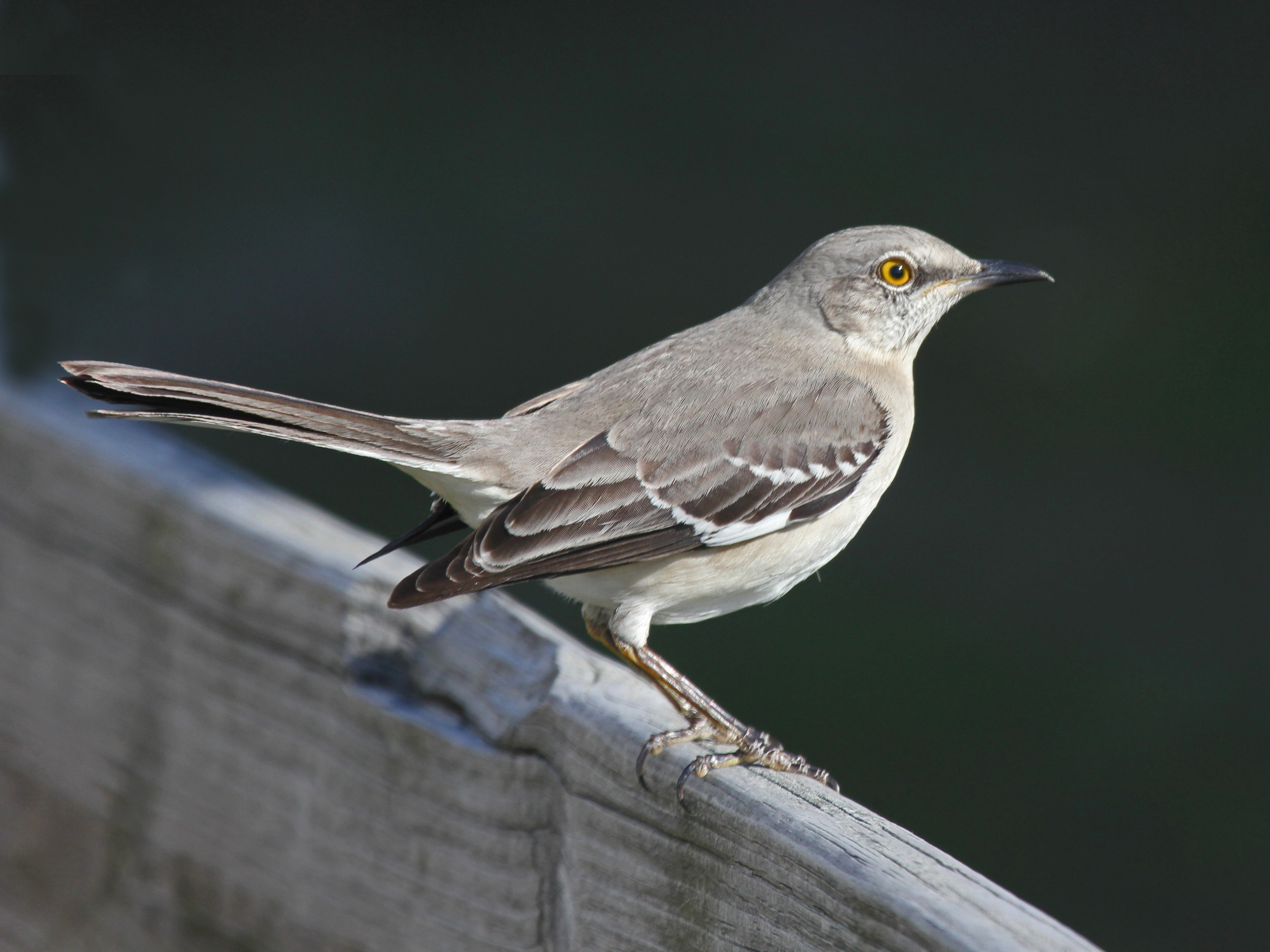
Adult at Sunset Beach, North Carolina

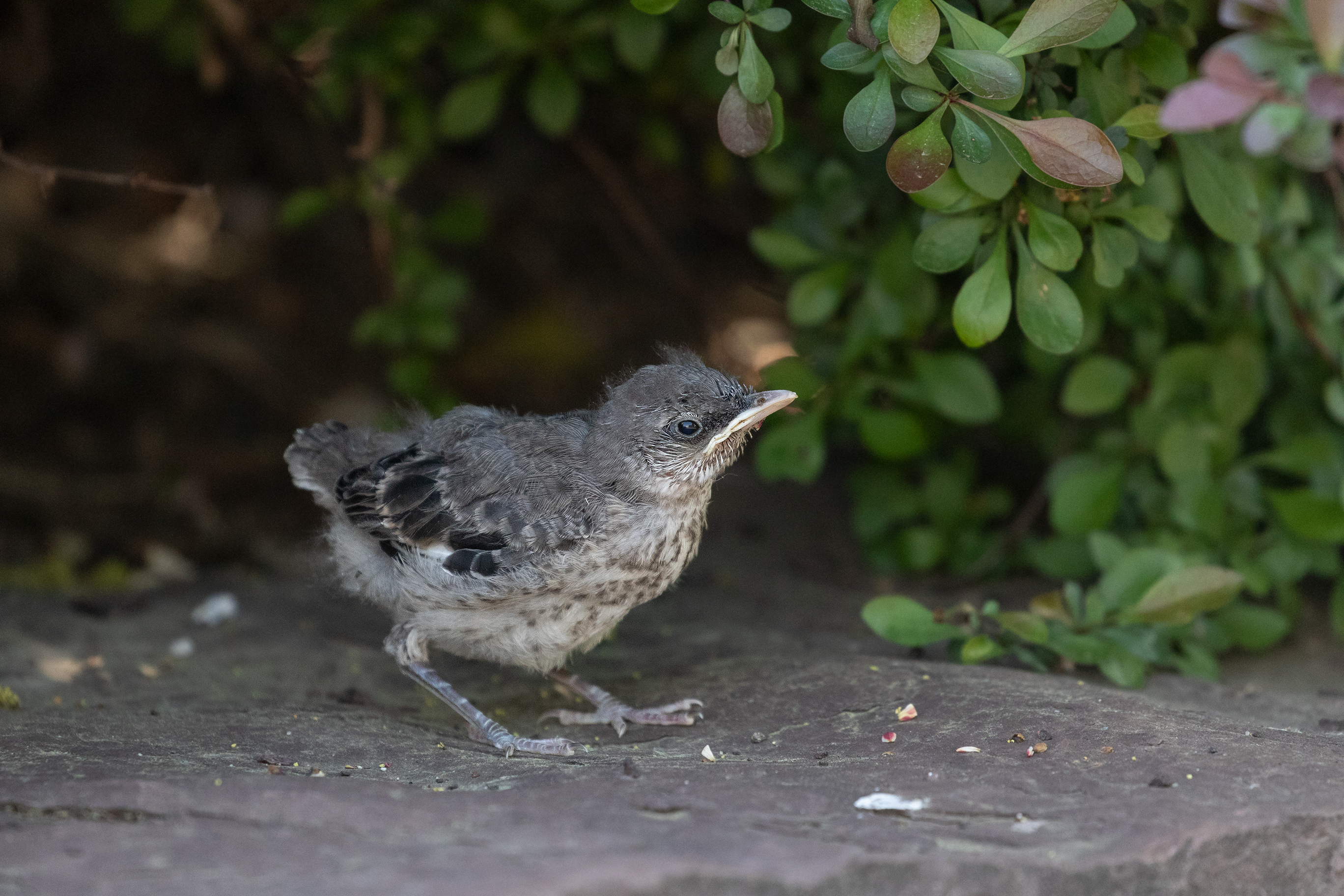
Fledgling mockingbird in
Philadelphia, Pennsylvania

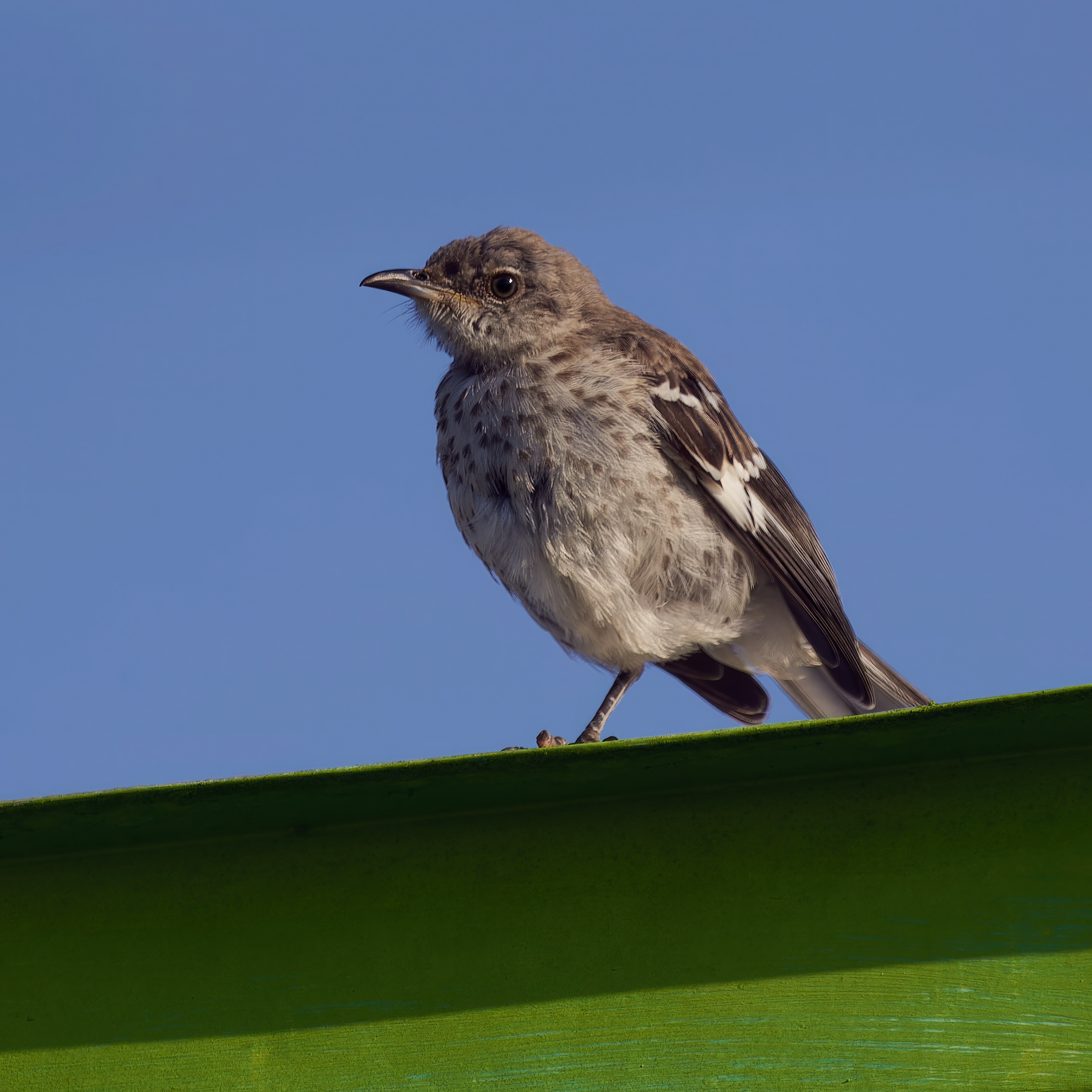
Juvenile northern mockingbird with spotting visible

The northern mockingbird is a medium-sized mimid that has long legs and tail. Males and females look alike. Its upper parts are colored gray, while its underparts have a white or whitish-gray color. It has parallel wing bars on the half of the wings connected near the white patch giving it a distinctive appearance in flight. The black central rectrices and typical white lateral rectrices are also noticeable in flight. The iris is usually a light green-yellow or a yellow, but there have been instances of an orange color. The bill is black with a brownish black appearance at the base. The juvenile appearance is marked by its streaks on its back, distinguished spots and streaks on its chest, and a gray or grayish-green iris.

Northern mockingbirds measure from 20.5 to 28 cm (8.1 to 11.0 in) including a tail almost as long as its body. The wingspan can range from 31–38 cm (12–15 in) and body mass is from 40–58 g (1.4–2.0 oz). Males tend to be slightly larger than females. Among standard measurements, the wing chord is 10 to 12 cm (3.9 to 4.7 in), the tail is 10 to 13.4 cm (3.9 to 5.3 in), the culmen is 1.6 to 1.9 cm (0.63 to 0.75 in) and the tarsus is 2.9 to 3.4 cm (1.1 to 1.3 in).

The northern mockingbird's lifespan is observed to be up to 8 years, but captive birds can live up to 20 years.

== Distribution and habitat ==
The mockingbird's breeding range is from the Maritime provinces of southern Canada, westwards to southern Oregon, and south through practically the entire continental United States south of the northern Plains states and Pacific Northwest, the Greater Antilles, and the majority of Mexico to eastern Oaxaca and Veracruz. The mockingbird is generally a year-round resident of its range, but birds that live in the northern portion of its range often move south during the winter season. The mockingbird is thought to be at least partly migratory in the northern portions of its range, but the migratory behavior is not well understood. Small numbers of northern mockingbird have also been recorded north of the breeding range, north to southeastern Alaska, and three times as transatlantic vagrants in Britain, most recently an individual which moved northeast through Britain from Devon via West Sussex to Northumberland in February to May 2021.

In the 19th century, the range of the mockingbird expanded northward towards provinces such as Nova Scotia and Ontario and states such as Massachusetts, although the sightings were sporadic. Within the first five decades of the 20th century, regions that received an influx of mockingbirds were Maine, Vermont, Ohio, Iowa, and New York. In western states such as California, the population was restricted to the Lower Sonoran Desert regions but by the 1970s the mockingbird was residential in most counties.

Islands that have had human-mediated introductions of mockingbirds include Hawaii (where it was introduced in the 1920s), Barbados, St. Helena, Socorro Island, the Cayman Islands, Tahiti, and Bermuda (in which it failed).

The mockingbird's habitat varies by location, but it prefers open areas with sparse vegetation. In the eastern regions, suburban and urban areas such as parks and gardens are frequent residential areas. It has an affinity for mowed lawns with shrubs within proximity for shade and nesting. In western regions, desert scrub and chaparral are among its preferred habitats. When foraging for food, it prefers short grass. This bird does not nest in densely forested areas, and generally resides in the same habitats year round.

== Behavior ==
=== Diet ===
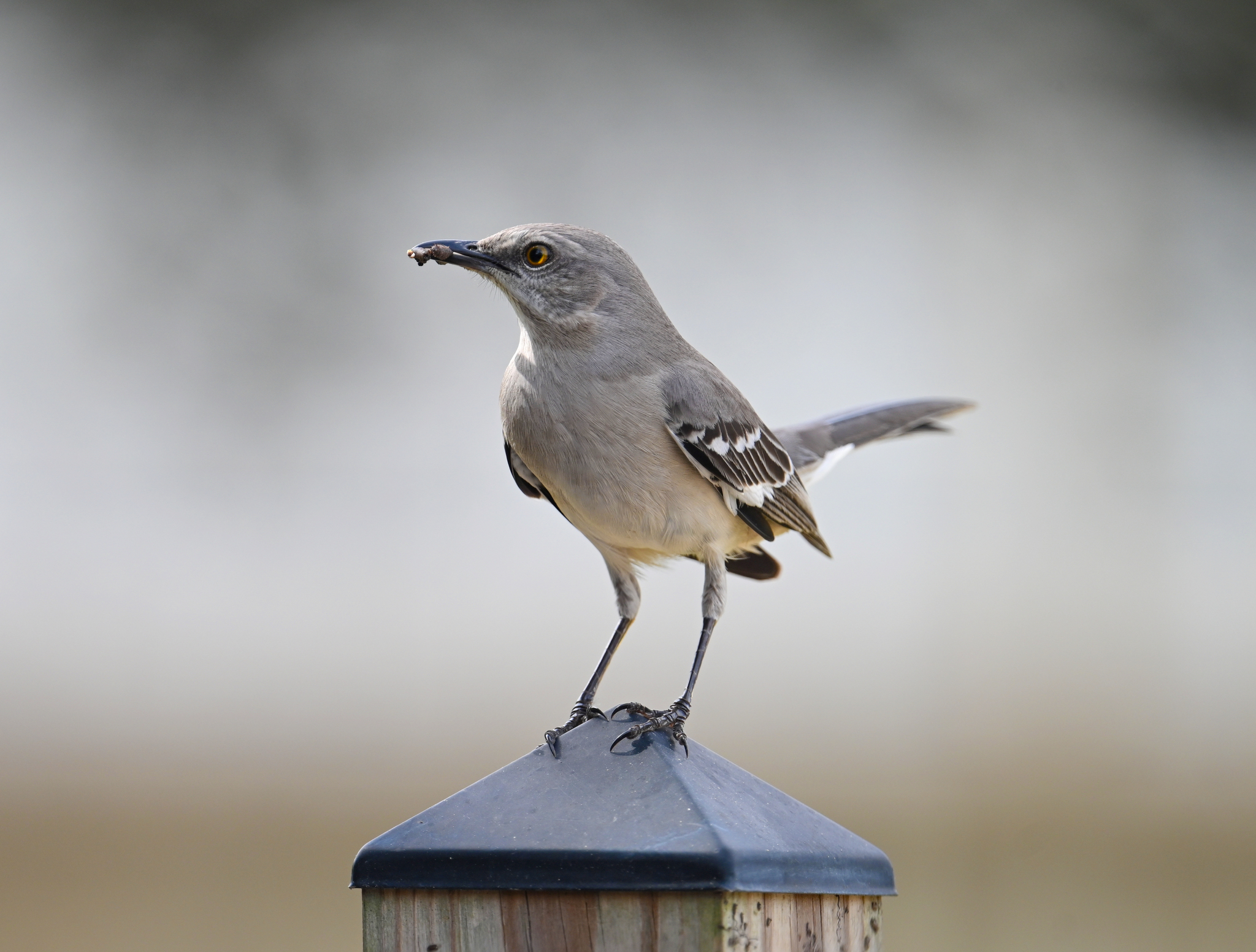
With crane fly larvae

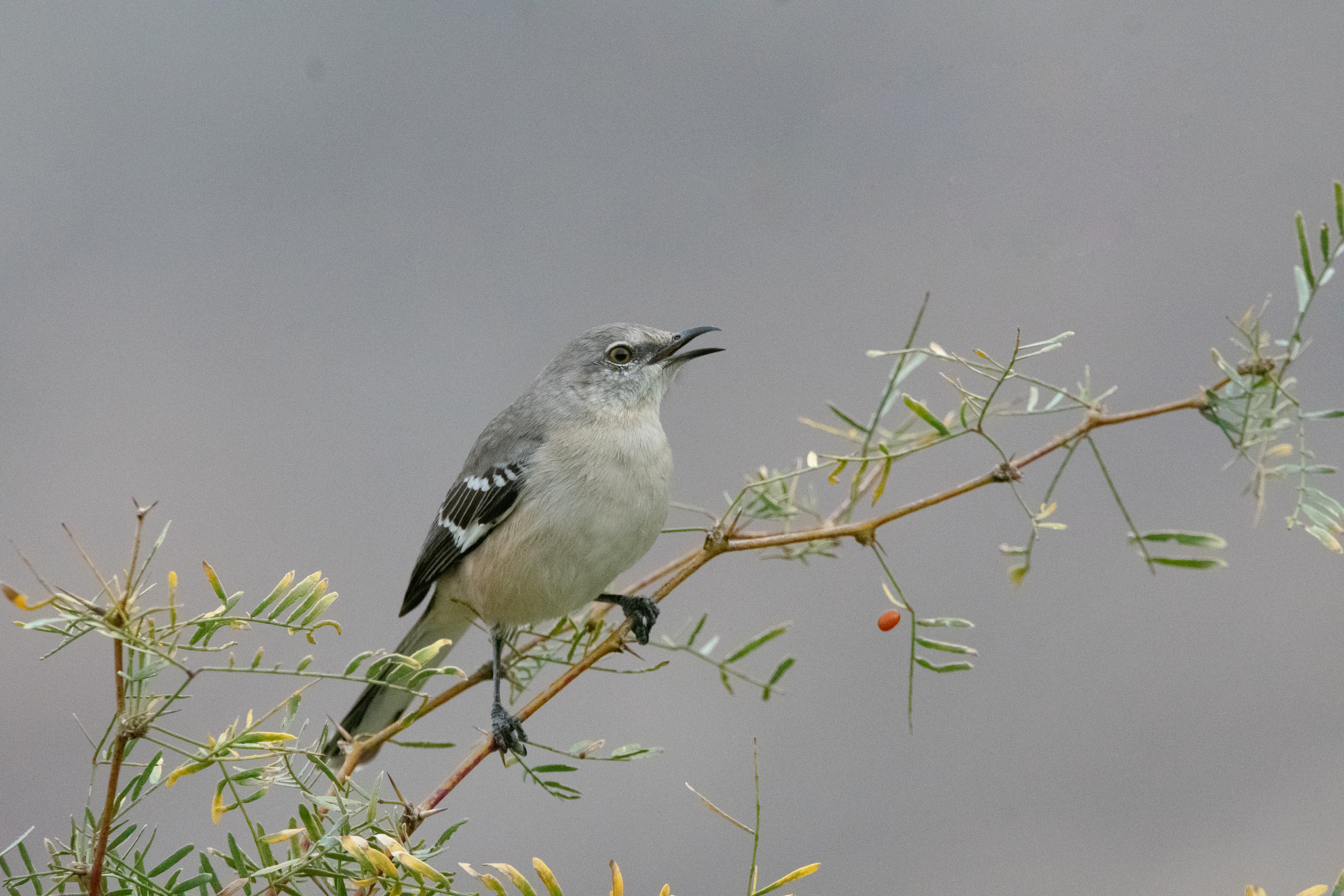
Rejecting fruit from a wolfberry (Lycium berlandieri) shrub, Palm Canyon (California).

The northern mockingbird is an omnivore. The birds' diet consists of arthropods (such as spiders, grasshoppers, wasps, bees, ants, beetles, butterflies, and caterpillars), earthworms, berries, fruits, seeds, and occasionally flowers, small crustaceans, and lizards (Anolis spp.). Mockingbirds can drink from puddles, river and lake edges, or dew and rain droplets that amass onto plants. Adult mockingbirds also have been seen drinking sap from the cuts on recently pruned trees. Its diet heavily consists of animal prey during the breeding season, but takes a drastic shift to fruits during the fall and winter. The drive for fruits amid winter has been noted for the geographic expansion of the mockingbird, and in particular, the fruit of Rosa multiflora, a favorite of the birds, is a possible link. Mockingbirds also eat garden fruits such as tomatoes, apples, and berries (like blackberries, raspberries, other bramble fruits, holly berries, mulberries, and dogwood), as well as grapes and figs.

These birds forage on the ground or in vegetation; they also fly down from a perch to capture food. While foraging, they frequently spread their wings in a peculiar two-step motion to display the white patches. There is disagreement among ornithologists over the purpose of this behavior, with hypotheses ranging from deceleration to intimidation of predators or prey.

=== Breeding ===
A boundary dance between two mockingbirds

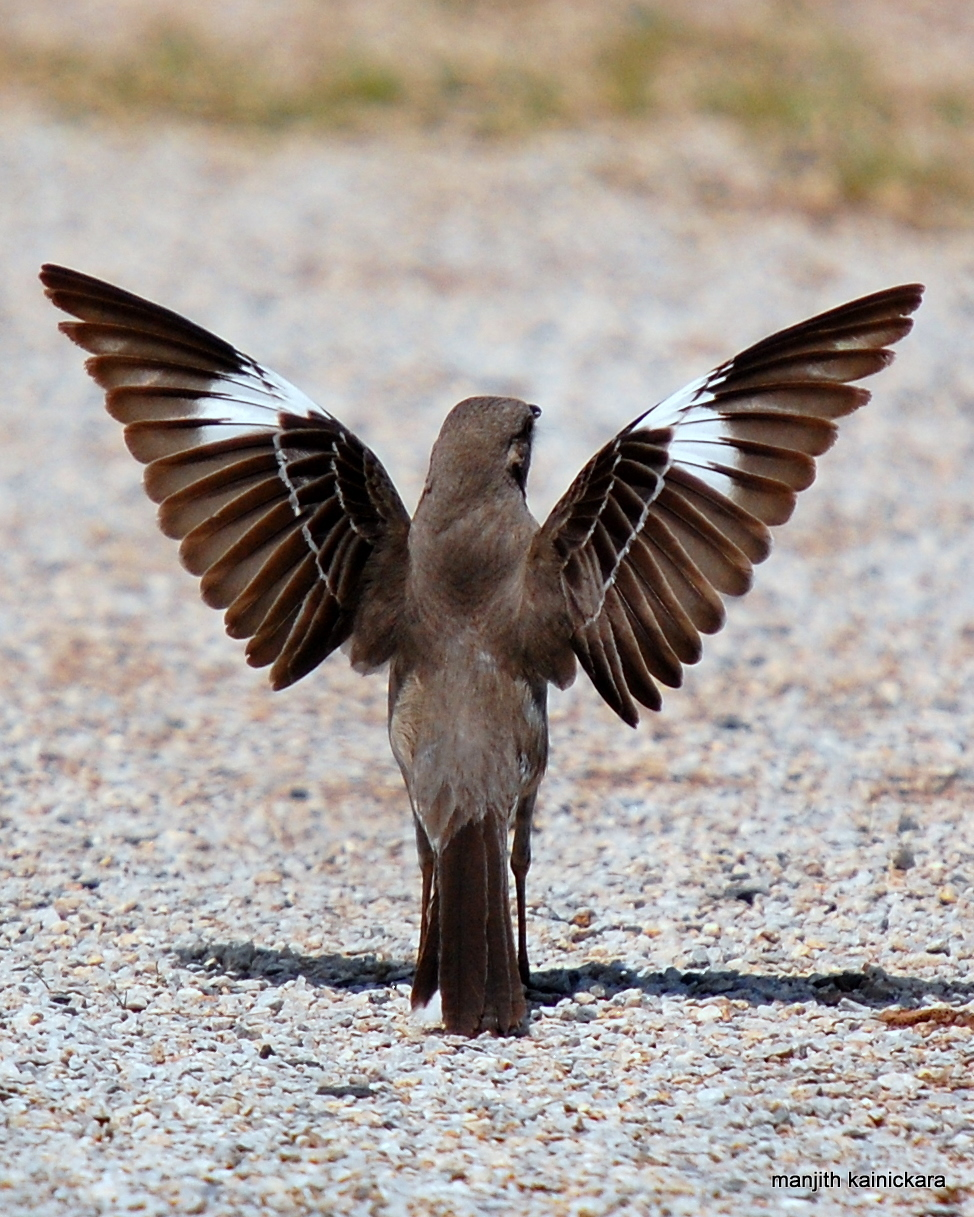
Displaying

Both the male and female of the species reach sexual maturity after one year of life. The breeding season occurs in the spring and early summer. The males arrive before the beginning of the season to establish their territories. They may demonstrate or contest the edges of a territory using a boundary dance in which males, typically on the ground, face each other and hop side to side, sometimes fighting, until one flies away. The males use a series of courtship displays to attract the females to their sites. They run around the area either to showcase their territory to the females or to pursue the females. The males also engage in flight to showcase their wings. They sing and call as they perform all of these displays. The species can remain monogamous for many years, but incidents of polygyny and bigamy have been reported to occur during a single bird's lifetime.

Both the male and female are involved in the nest building. The male does most of the work, while the female perches on the shrub or tree where the nest is being built to watch for predators. The nest is built approximately three to ten feet above the ground. The outer part of the nest is composed of twigs, while the inner part is lined with grasses, dead leaves, moss, or artificial fibers. The eggs are a light blue or greenish color and speckled with dots. The female lays three to five eggs, and she incubates them for nearly two weeks. Once the eggs are hatched, both the male and female will feed the chicks.

The birds aggressively defend their nests and surrounding areas against other birds and animals. When a predator is persistent, mockingbirds from neighboring territories may be summoned by distinct calls to join the defense. Other birds may gather to watch as the mockingbirds drive away the intruder. In addition to harassing domestic cats and dogs that they consider a threat, mockingbirds will at times target humans. The birds are bold, and will attack much larger birds, even hawks. One incident in Tulsa, Oklahoma involving a postal carrier resulted in the distribution of a warning letter to residents.

The northern mockingbird pairs hatch about two to four broods a year. In one breeding attempt, the northern mockingbird lays an average of four eggs. They are pale blue or greenish white with red or brown blotches, and measure about 25 by 18 millimetres (0.98 by 0.71 in). They hatch after about 11 to 14 days of incubation by the female. After about 10 to 15 days of life, the offspring become independent.

==== Sexual selection ====
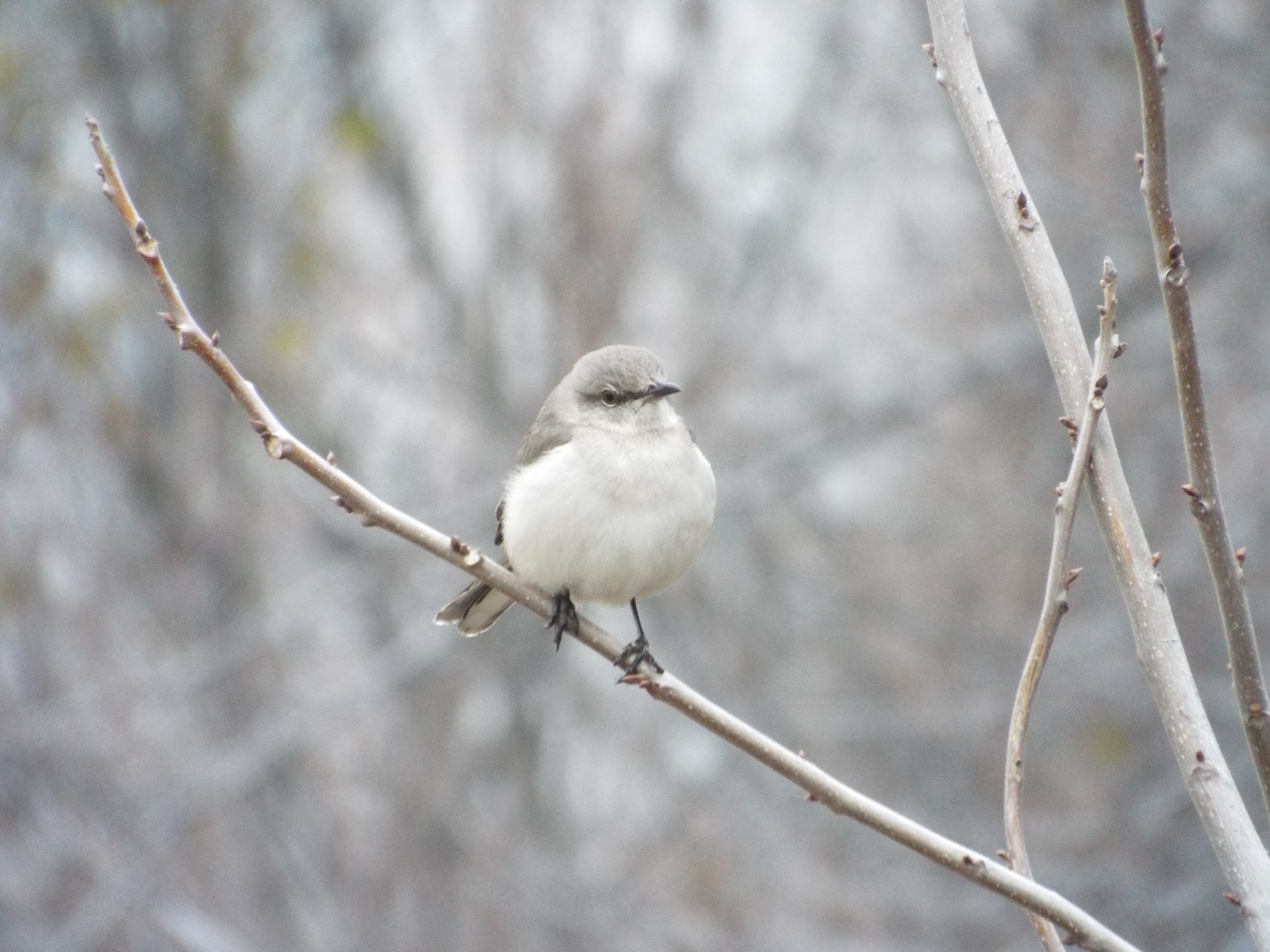
Adult mockingbirds have solid pale grey or buff breasts, juveniles mottled.

Northern mockingbirds are famous for their song repertoires. Studies have shown that males sing songs at the beginning of breeding season to attract females. Unmated males sing songs in more directions and sing more bouts than mated males. In addition, unmated males perform more flight displays than mated males. The mockingbirds usually nest several times during one breeding season. Depending on the stage of breeding and the mating status, a male mockingbird will vary his song production. The unmated male keeps close track of this change. He sings in one direction when he perceives a chance to lure a female from the nest of the mated male. Unmated males are also more likely to use elevated perches to make their songs audible farther away. Though the mockingbirds are socially monogamous, mated males have been known to sing to attract additional mates.

An observational study by Logan demonstrates that the female is continuously evaluating the quality of the male and his territory. The assessment is usually triggered by the arrival of a new male in a neighboring territory at the beginning of a new breeding season. In those cases, the mated female is constantly seen flying over both the original and the new male's territory, evaluating the qualities of both territories and exchanging calls with both males. The social mate displays aggressive behaviors towards the female, while the new male shows less aggression and sings softer songs. At the same time, both the mated male and the new male will fly over other territories to attract other females as well. Separation, mate switching and extra-pair matings do occur in northern mockingbirds.

==== Sex allocation ====
Northern mockingbirds adjust the sex ratio of their offspring according to the food availability and population density. Male offspring usually require more parental investment. There is therefore a bias for bearing the costlier sex at the beginning of a breeding season when the food is abundant. Local resource competition predicts that the parents have to share the resources with offspring that remain at the natal site after maturation. In passerine birds, like the northern mockingbird, females are more likely to disperse than males. Hence, it is adaptive to produce more dispersive sex than philopatric sex when the population density is high and the competition for local resources is intense. Since northern mockingbirds are abundant in urban environments, it is possible that the pollution and contamination in cities might affect sexual hormones and therefore play a role in offspring sex ratio.

==== Mating ====
Northern mockingbirds are socially monogamous. The sexes look alike except that the male is slightly larger than the female. Mutual mate choice is exhibited in northern mockingbirds. Both males and females prefer mates that are more aggressive towards intruders, and so exhibit greater parental investment. However, males are more defensive of their nests than females. In a population where male breeding adults outnumber female breeding adults, females have more freedom in choosing their mates. In these cases, these female breeders have the option of changing mates within a breeding season if the first male does not provide a high level of parental care, which includes feeding and nest defense. High nesting success is associated with highly aggressive males attacking intruders in the territory, and so these males are preferred by females.

==== Parental care ====
Northern mockingbirds are altricial, meaning that, when hatched, they are born relatively immobile and defenseless and therefore require nourishment for a certain duration from their parents. The young have a survival bottleneck at the nestling stage because there are higher levels of nestling predation than egg predation. The levels of belligerence exhibited by parents therefore increase once eggs hatch but there is no increase during the egg stage.

A recent study shows that both food availability and temperature affect the parental incubation of the eggs in northern mockingbirds. Increasing food availability provides the females with more time to care for the nest and perform self-maintenance. Increasing temperature, however, reduces the time the females spend at the nest and there is increased energy cost to cool the eggs. The incubation behavior is a trade-off among various environmental factors.

Mockingbird nests are also often parasitized by cowbirds. The parents are found to reject parasitic eggs at an intermediate rate. A recent study has shown that foreign eggs are more likely to be rejected from a nest later in the breeding season than from earlier in a breeding season. Early nesting hosts may not have learned the pattern and coloration of their first clutch yet, so are less likely to reject foreign eggs. There is also a seasonal threshold in terms of the overlap between the breeding seasons of the northern mockingbirds and their parasites. If the breeding season of the parasites starts later, there is less likelihood of parasitism. Hence, it pays the hosts to have relatively lower sensitivity to parasitic eggs.

An adult northern mockingbird feeding berries to a fledgling

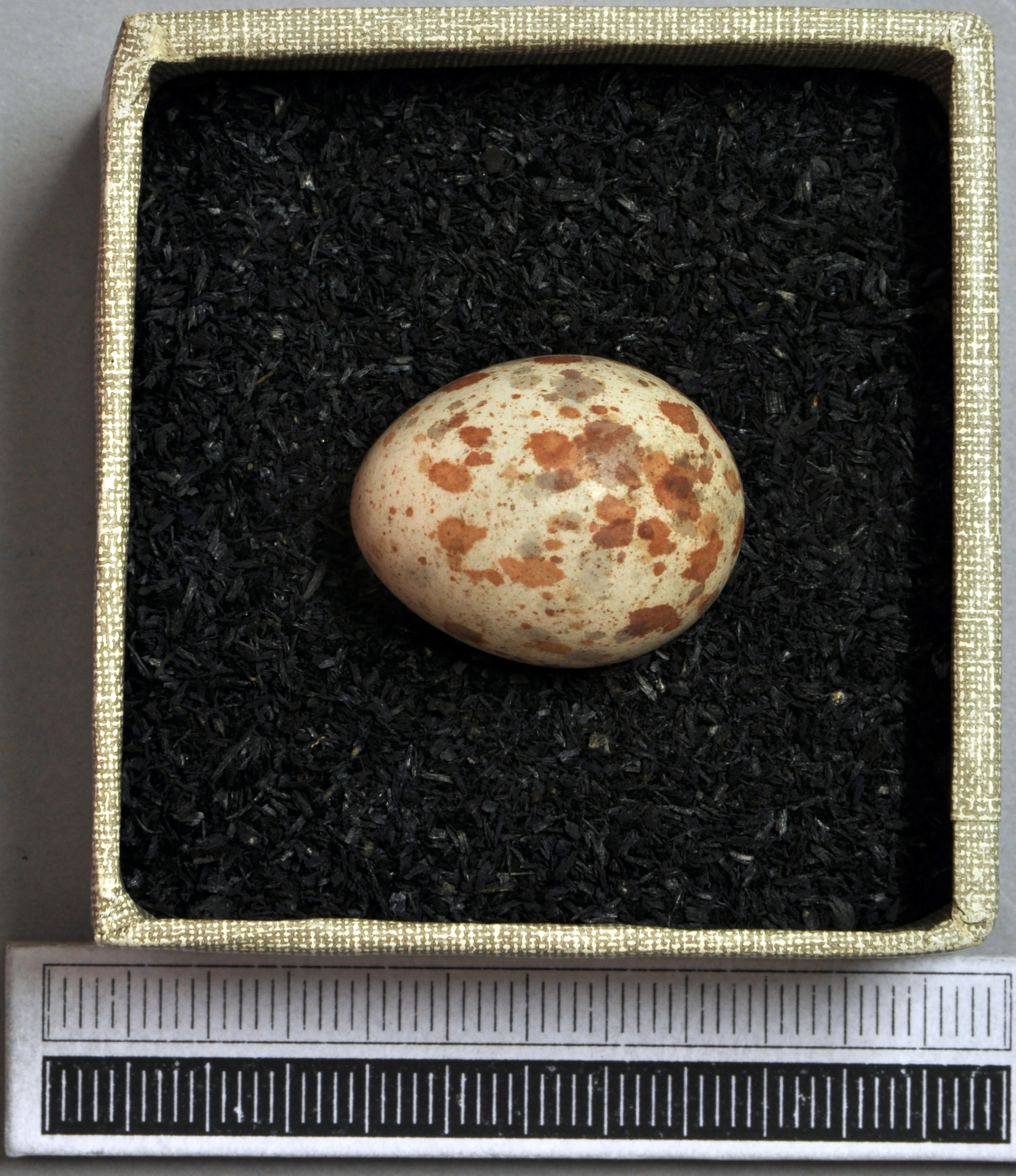
Egg, Collection Museum Wiesbaden

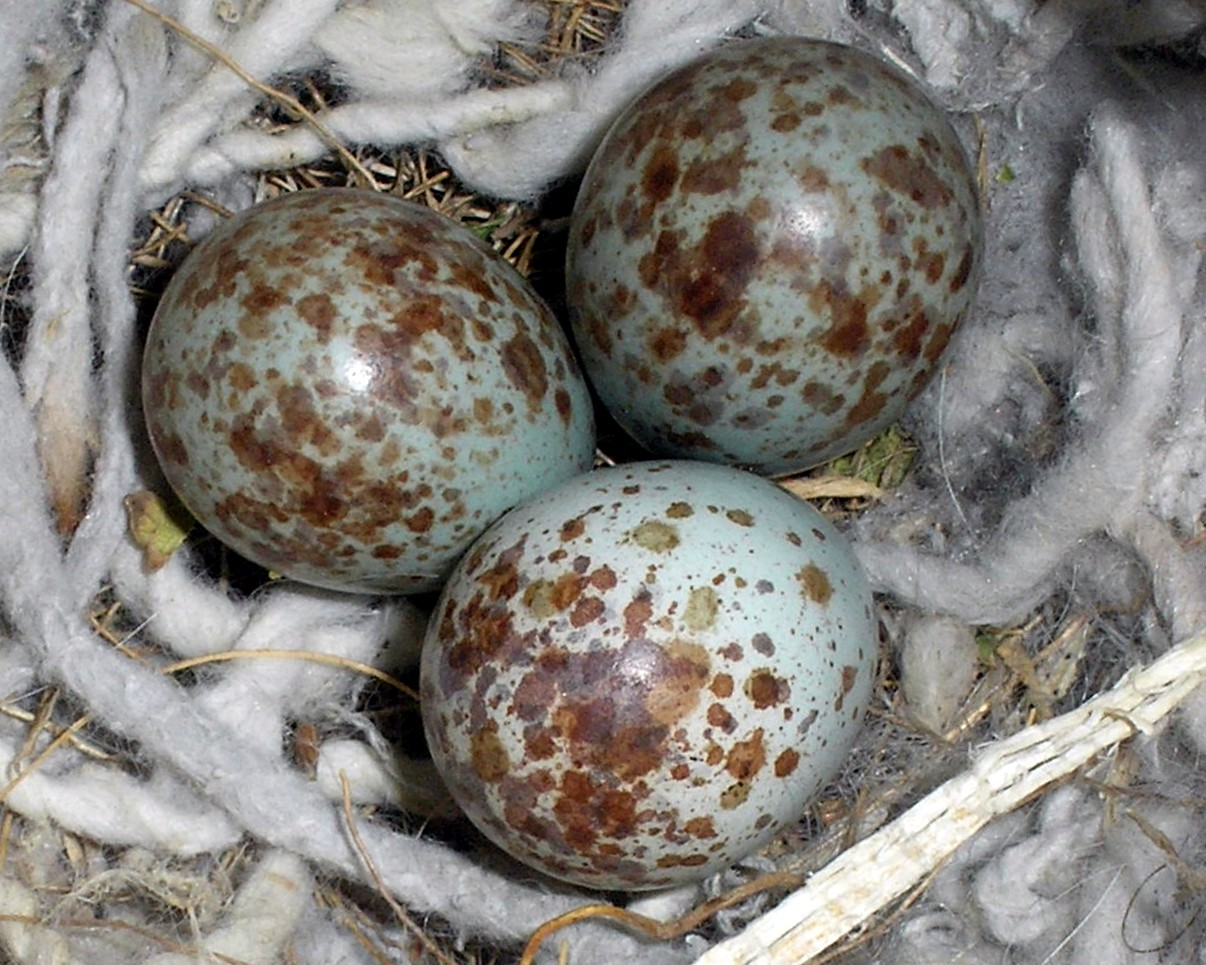
Eggs in a nest

==== Ontogeny ====
A laboratory observation of 38 mockingbird nestlings and fledglings (thirty-five and three, respectively) recorded the behavioral development of young mockingbirds. Notable milestones, including the eyes opening, soft vocalizations, begging, and preening, began within the first six days of life. Variation in begging and more compact movements such as perching, fear crouching, and stretching appeared by the ninth day. Wing-flashing, bathing, flight, and leaving the nest happened within seventeen days (nest leaving occurred within 11 to 13 days). Improvements of flight, walking and self-feeding took place within forty days. Agonistic behavior increased during the juvenile stages, to the extent that one of two siblings living in the same area was likely killed by the other.

=== Song and calls ===
Songs and calls

Calling during spring

Although many species of bird imitate the vocalizations of other birds, the northern mockingbird is the species best known in North America for doing so. Among the vocalizations it imitates are songs of the Carolina wren, northern cardinal, tufted titmouse, eastern towhee, house sparrow, wood thrush, and eastern bluebird, calls of the northern flicker and great crested flycatcher, jeers and pumphandles of the blue jay, and alarms, chups, and chirrs of the American robin. It imitates not only birds, but also other animals such as cats, dogs, frogs, and crickets and sounds from artificial items such as unoiled wheels and even car alarms. As convincing as these imitations may be to humans, they often fail to fool other birds, such as the Florida scrub jay.

The northern mockingbird's mimicry is likely to serve as a form of sexual selection through which competition between males and female choice influence a bird's song repertoire size. A 2013 study attempted to determine model selection in vocal mimics, and the data suggested that mimicry in the mockingbird resulted from the bird being genetically predisposed to learning vocalizations with acoustic characteristics such as an enlarged auditory template.

Both male and female mockingbirds sing, with the latter being generally quieter and less vocal. Male commencement of singing is in late January to February and continues into the summer and the establishing of territory into the fall. Frequency in female singing is more sporadic, as it sings less often in the summer and fall, and only sings when the male is away from the territory. The mockingbird also possesses a large song repertoire that ranges from 43 to 203 song types and the size varies by region. Repertoire sizes ranged from 14 to 150 types in Texas, and two studies of mockingbirds in Florida rounded estimates to 134 and 200, approximately. It continually expands its repertoire during its life, though it pales in comparison to mimids such as the brown thrasher.

There are four recognized calls for the mockingbird: the nest relief call, hew call, chat or chatburst, and the begging call. The hew call is mainly used by both sexes for potential nest predators, conspecific chasing, and various interactions between mates. One difference between chats and chatbursts is frequency of use, as chats are year-round and chatbursts occur in the fall. Another difference is that chatbursts appear to be used in territorial defense in the fall and chats are used by either sex when disturbed. The nest relief and begging calls are only used by the males.

== Predation and threats ==
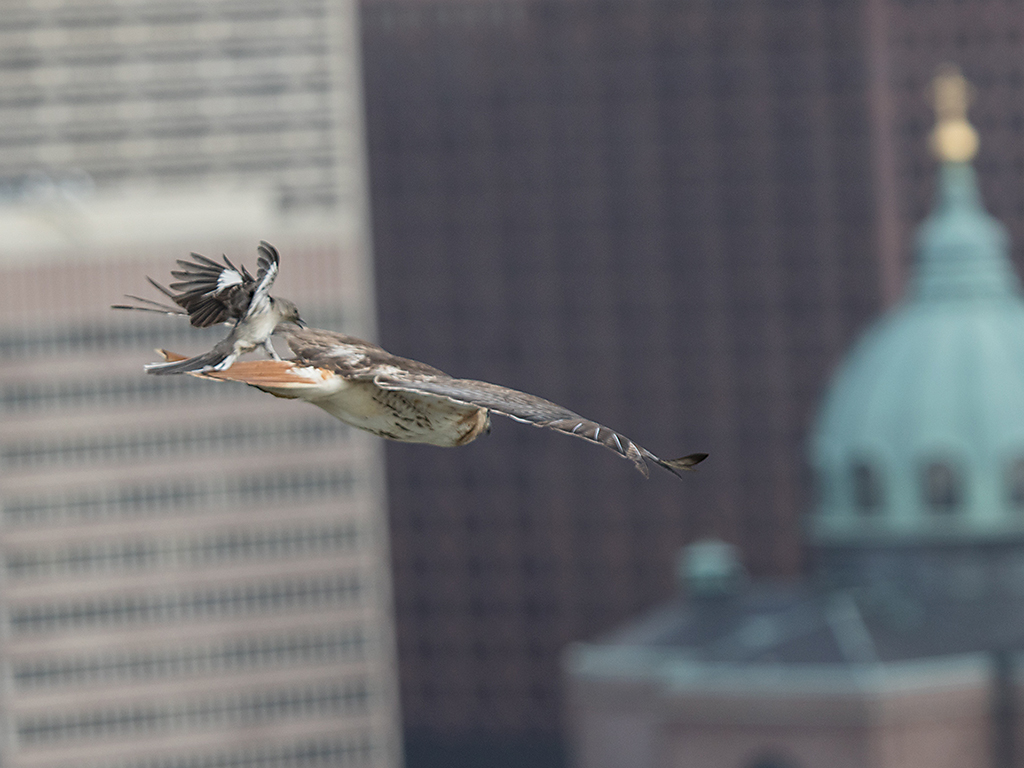
Riding a red-tailed hawk

Adult mockingbirds can fall victim to birds of prey such as the great horned owl, screech owl and sharp-shinned hawk, though their tenacious behavior makes them less likely to be captured. Scrub jays also have killed and eaten mockingbirds. Snakes rarely capture incubating females. Fledglings have been prey to domestic cats, red-tailed hawks, and crows. Eggs and nestlings are consumed by blue jays, fish crows, American crows, red-tailed hawks, swallow-tailed kites, snakes, squirrels, and cats. Blowfly larvae and Haemoproteus have been found in Florida and Arizona populations, respectively.

Winter storms limit the expansion of mockingbirds in their range. Such storms have played a role in the declining of the populations in Ohio (where it has since recovered), Michigan, Minnesota, and likely in Quebec. Dry seasons also affect the mockingbird populations in Arizona.

Populations of this species dropped significantly in some areas of the eastern coastal United States during the nineteenth century. The main contributor to this decline was the rising popularity of mockingbirds as cage birds, resulting in many wild birds being captured and sold. Mockingbird populations have since rebounded as a result of conservation efforts.

== Intelligence ==
In a paper published in 2009, researchers found that mockingbirds were able to recall an individual human who, earlier in the study, had approached and threatened the mockingbirds' nest. Researchers had one participant stand near a mockingbird nest and touch it, while others avoided the nest. Later, the mockingbirds recognized the intruder and exhibited defensive behavior, while ignoring the other individuals. A similar paper published in 2023 had several participants exhibit varying levels of threatening behavior towards nesting mockingbirds. During a three-day training period, "high threat" participants were instructed to touch the nest daily while accompanied by a "medium threat" participant who stood three meters away. "Low threat" participants approached the nest separately and also stood three meters away for 10 minutes. When flushed from their nests by participants during a testing period, the mockingbirds retreated further from individuals who had exhibited more threatening behavior during the training period.

Another study tested the ability of mockingbirds to differentiate between different options when foraging. Mockingbirds were tasked with removing sticks supporting a platform that held food. The birds most often chose to remove as few sticks as possible when given the option to remove two or five sticks, and did not appear to improve in this ability between trials. This suggests that mockingbirds may have an innate ability to compare quantities of objects that allows them to make more optimal decisions in some cases.

=== Adaptation to urban habitats ===
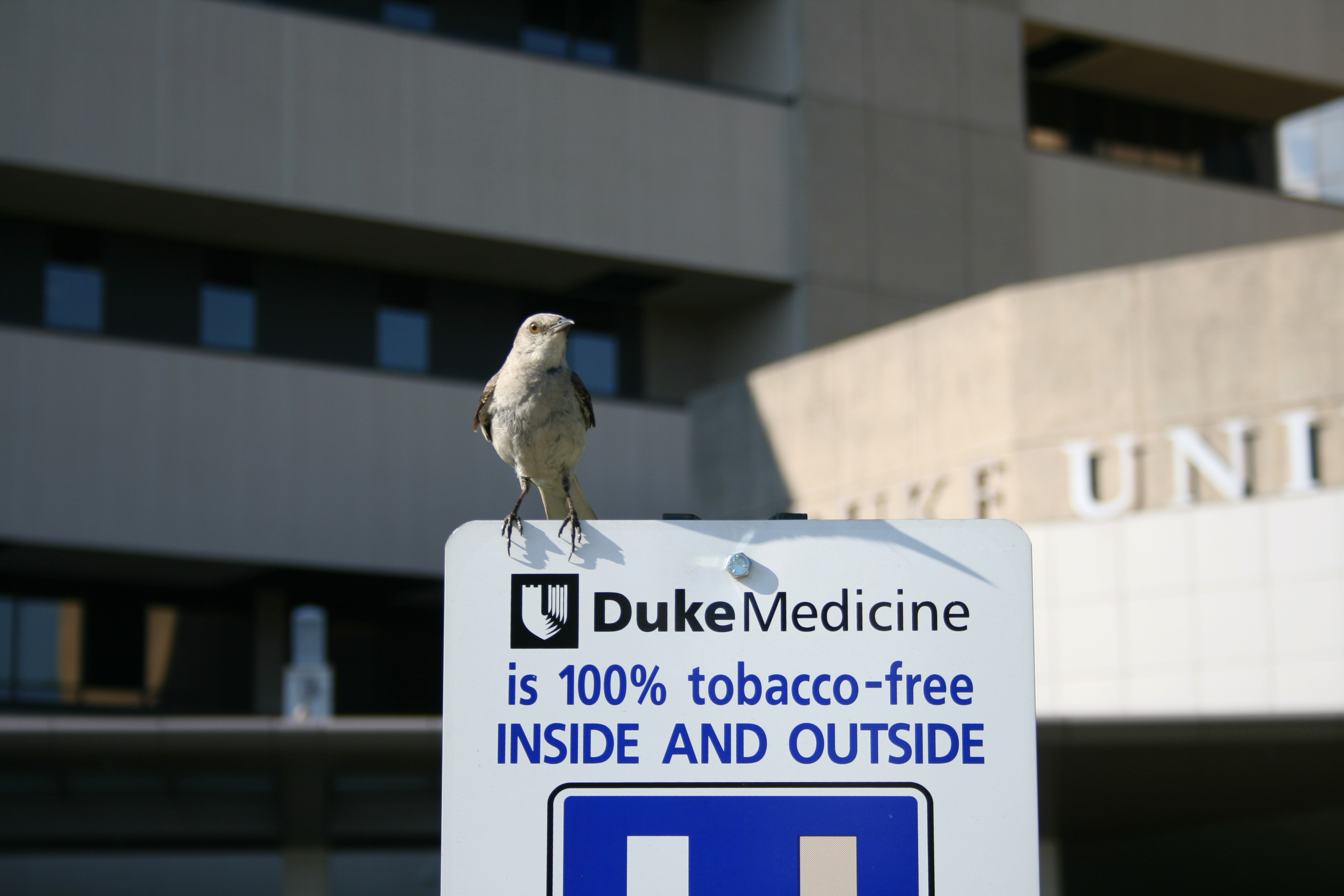
In an urban habitat of Durham, North Carolina

The northern mockingbird is a species that is found in both urban and rural habitats. There are now more northern mockingbirds living in urban habitats than non-urban environments, so they are consequently known as an urban-positive species. Biologists have long questioned how northern mockingbirds adapt to a novel environment in cities, and whether they fall into the typical ecological traps that are common for urban-dwelling birds. A comparative study between an urban dwelling population and a rural dwelling one shows that the apparent survival is higher for individuals in the urban habitats. Lower food availability and travel costs may account for the higher mortality rate in rural habitats. Urban birds are more likely to return to the nest where they had successfully bred the previous year and avoid those where breeding success was low. One explanation for this phenomenon is that urban environments are more predictable than non-urban ones, as the site fidelity among urban birds prevents them from falling into ecological traps. Mockingbirds are also able to utilize artificial lighting in order to feed nestlings in urban areas such as residential neighborhoods into the night, in contrast to those that do not nest near those areas. The adaptation of the mockingbird in urban habitats has led it to become more susceptible to lead poisoning in Baltimore and Washington, D.C. populations.

== In culture ==
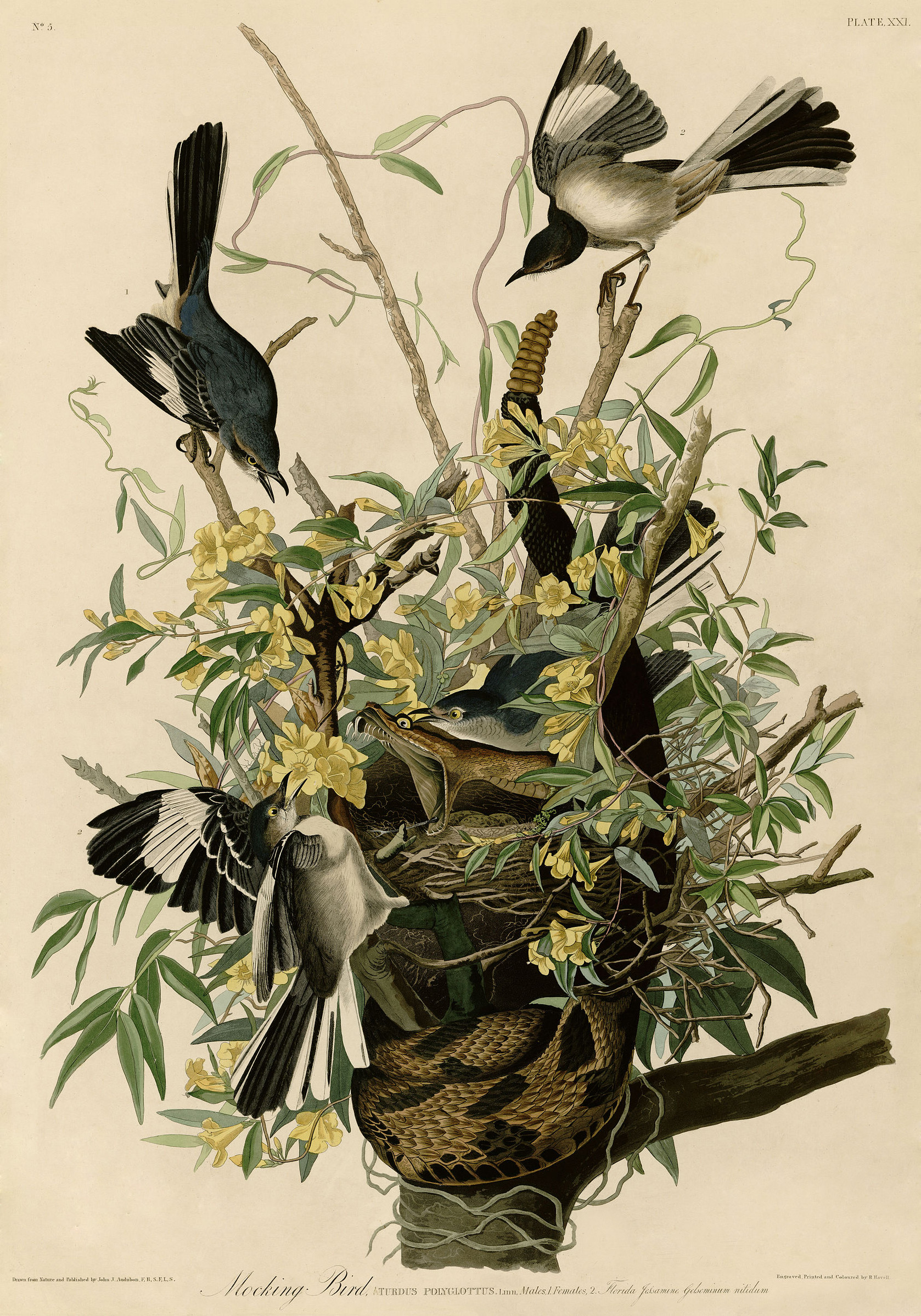
Painting by John James Audubon

This bird features in the title and central metaphor of the 1960 novel To Kill a Mockingbird, by Harper Lee. In that novel, mockingbirds are portrayed as innocent and generous, and two of the major characters, Atticus Finch and Miss Maudie, say it is a sin to kill a mockingbird because "they don't do one thing for us but make music for us to enjoy. They don't eat up people's gardens, don't nest in corncribs, they don't do one thing but sing their hearts out for us."

The Hunger Games franchise depicts "mockingjays", mockingbirds hybridized with jabberjays, genetically engineered birds which could memorize and repeat entire human conversations. These birds appear throughout the series as a rebellious symbol.

The traditional lullaby "Hush Little Baby" has a line that goes "Papa's gonna buy you a mockingbird".

The song of the northern mockingbird inspired many American folk songs of the mid-19th century, such as "Listen to the Mocking Bird".

Thomas Jefferson had several pet mockingbirds, including a bird named "Dick".

In the fictional Neighborhood of Make-Believe on Mister Rogers' Neighborhood, one of King Friday's "pets" is a wooden northern mockingbird on a stick, which he refers to by the scientific name Mimus polyglottos.

In 1951, Patti Page, a popular vocalist, recorded "Mockin' Bird Hill", which was sold in 10" 78 RPM format. The song reached #2 on Billboard's pop music chart and reflected gentle postwar values of the period.

== State bird ==
The northern mockingbird is the state bird of Arkansas, Florida, Mississippi, Tennessee, and Texas, and previously the state bird of South Carolina.

== See also ==
- List of birds of Puerto Rico
