= World Builder (disambiguation) =

World Builder is an authoring system for point-and-click adventure games.

World Builder may also refer to:

- World Builder (film), a 2007 short film by Bruce Branit
- World Builder (map editor), a map editor for the Command & Conquer: Generals computer game
- World Builder, a map editor for the Civilization IV computer game
- Lego World Builder, an online platform ran by Tongal
- Bonei Olam (בוני עולם, "Builders of the World"), a Brooklyn, New York-based fertility assistance organization that assists Jewish couples

== See also ==
- Empire Builder (disambiguation)
- Level editor
- World (disambiguation)
- Builder (disambiguation)
