= Builder =

Builder may refer to:

== Construction ==
- Construction worker, who specializes in building work
- Carpenter, a skilled craftsman who works with wood
- General contractor, that specializes in building work
  - Subcontractor
- Real estate developer, who causes buildings to be constructed

== Media ==
- Builders (film), a 1942 British propaganda film
- The Builder (film), 2010 film
- The Builder, British magazine now known as Building
- Builder, American magazine published by Zonda Home
- "The Builder" (short story), a 1953 short story by Philip K. Dick
- "The Builders", an episode in the 1970s British television comedy Fawlty Towers
- "Builder" (Not Going Out), a 2019 television episode
- Builders, international music group also known as The Bilders, Bilderbergers and Bilderine

== Other ==
- Builder (detergent), a component of modern detergents
- Builder (hockey), in ice hockey, manages or builds the game
- Builder (United States Navy), U.S. Navy Rating
- Builder pattern, an object-oriented design pattern
- Interactive Scenario Builder, an RF Tactical Decision Aid often referred to as Builder
- Build engineer, a software engineer specializing in builds (versions) of large software products

== See also ==
- Buildering, rock-climbing on the outside of a building
- Constructor (disambiguation)
- C++Builder
- World Builder (disambiguation)
- Build (disambiguation),
- Bob the Builder, a British preschool animated television programme
- The Institute of Builders, British professional society
