= With One Voice =

With One Voice may refer to:

== Films ==
- The 2009 documentary With One Voice

== Hymnals ==
- The international edition of the Australian Hymn Book
- A supplement to the Lutheran Book of Worship
