= Kornhaber Brown =

Video production company based in New York City

- Industry: Film/TV/Digital Production
- Founded: 2009
- Founders: Eric Brown and Andrew Kornhaber
- Headquarters: New York, NY
- Website: www.kornhaberbrown.com

Kornhaber Brown is an independent video production company based in New York City. The company has created shows and campaigns for MTV, PBS, Riot Games, Complex Networks, Condé Nast, Fusion, YouTube, Univision, AMC Networks, and HGTV.

== History ==
Kornhaber Brown was founded in 2009 by Eric Brown and Andrew Kornhaber. Its first notable release was the video Porn Sex vs. Real Sex: The Differences Explained With Food, which received over eighteen million views and was honored by The Webby Awards in 2014.

It created the PBS Digital Studios series Off Book, Idea Channel Game/Show, Infinite Series, Stellar, and Space Time, and the MTV series Braless, Pants Off, Decoded, and The Racket.

The company was honored by The Webby Awards for Idea Channel, Braless and Decoded.

== Productions ==
=== Original channels/series ===
- PBS | PBS Off Book
- PBS | PBS Idea Channel
- PBS | PBS Game/Show
- PBS | PBS Infinite Series
- PBS | PBS Space Time
- PBS | Stellar
- MTV | MTV Braless
- MTV | MTV Decoded
- MTV | The Racket
- MTV | Pants Off
- Complex Networks | Group Therapy
- Riot Games | /All Chat
- Wired | Data Attack
- Flama | Secret Life of Babes
- Scripps Network | Awkward Moments
- Scripps Network | Do Better Daily
- HGTV | Can I Come In?

=== Viral videos ===
- AMC | "Could You Rip Out A Spine?" (2015)
- Glamour Magazine | "The History of the Bra: Styles From Every Fashion Era" (2015)
- YouTube Advertisers | "What Do You Really Know About Gamers?" (2015)
- Wired | "The Female Orgasm, Explained with Science Projects" (2015)
- Carnegie Hall | "43 Cartoon Theme Song Mashup | Ensemble ACJW" (2014)
- EngenderHealth | "History's Worst Contraceptives: WTFP?! — WheresTheFP.org" (2014)
- Kornhaber Brown | "Porn Sex vs Real Sex: The Differences Explained With Food" (2013)
- New York Theatre Workshop | "A Look At The New Musical, ONCE" (2012)
- MTV | "Everything You Know About Thanksgiving is Wrong" (2015)
- MTV | "White People Whitesplain Whitesplaining" (2015)

== Awards ==
=== The Webby Awards ===
- People's Voice – Online Film & Video – Public Service & Activism (Channel) (2015) – MTV Braless
- Online Film & Video – First Person (2014) – PBS Idea Channel
- Best Host (2013) – Mike Rugnetta – PBS Idea Channel
- Video Series & Channels (2017) – Public Service & Activism – MTV Decoded

=== CINE ===
- Golden Eagle Award – Narrative Content: Series/MiniSeries— Episodes of 30 Minutes or Less (2015) – 60SECOND PRESIDENTS

=== The Mashies ===
- Best Video Series (2013) – PBS Idea Channel
