= SIMDIS =

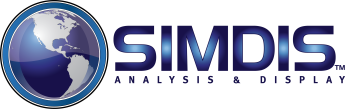
- Developer: Office of Naval Research
- Written in: C++
- Operating system: Windows, Linux, and Sun Microsystems
- Type: 3D computer graphics software
- Website: https://www.trmc.osd.mil/simdis.html

SIMDIS is a software toolset developed by Code 5770 at the US Naval Research Laboratory (NRL). The software provides 2D and 3D interactive graphical and video displays of live and postprocessed simulation, test, and operational data. SIMDIS is a portmanteau of simulation and display.

== Features ==
SIMDIS runs on Windows, Linux, and Sun Microsystems workstations with hardware-accelerated 3D graphics and provides identical execution and "look and feel" for all supported platforms.

SIMDIS provides either a 2D or a 3D display of the normally "seen" data such as platform position and orientation, as well as the "unseen" data such as the interactions of sensor systems with targets, countermeasures, and the environment. It includes custom tools for interactively analyzing and displaying data for equipment modes, spatial grids, ranges, angles, antenna patterns, line of sight and RF propagation. Capability for viewing time synchronized data from either a standalone workstation or multiple networked workstations is also provided.

To meet the needs of range operators, simulation users, analysts, and decision makers SIMDIS provides multiple modes of operation including live display, interactive playback, and scripted multimedia modes. It also provides capability for manipulation of post-processed data and integration with charts, graphs, pictures, audio and video for use in the development and delivery of 3-D visual presentations.

SIMDIS binaries are released under U.S. Department of Defense (DoD) Distribution Statement A, meaning the binaries are approved for public release with unlimited distribution. SIMDIS has been independently accredited and certified by Commander Operational Test and Evaluation Force (COMOPTEVFOR) and Joint Forces Command (JFCOM). It has also been approved for use on the Navy/Marine Corps Intranet (NMCI).

== Operational use ==
SIMDIS provides support for analysis and display of test and training mission data to more than 4000 users. At the Naval Research Laboratory and other sites, SIMDIS has been used for numerous simulation, test and training applications, analyzing disparate test data in a common frame of reference. SIMDIS is currently an operational display system for the Missile Defense Agency (MDA), the Naval Undersea Warfare Center (NUWC), the Pacific Missile Range Facility (PMRF), the Southern California Offshore Range (SCORE), and the Central Test and Evaluation Investment Program’s (CTEIP) Test and Training Enabling Architecture (TENA). In addition to the Defense community, SIMDIS has also gained acceptance in various other U.S. government organizations and in the foreign community.

== The SIMDIS SDK ==
The SIMDIS Software Development Kit (SDK) is a C++ framework providing functionality to create 3D scenes consisting of objects whose position and state change with time that are placed relative to a geographic map. The SIMDIS SDK is the underlying application framework supporting SIMDIS.

Around 2017, SIMDIS released its SDK on GitHub.

== Cost ==
Since SIMDIS requires no additional COTS products or license fees, the Range Commanders Council (RCC) currently lists SIMDIS as a cost savings/avoidance program for the US Department of Defense.

== See also ==
- Office of Naval Research (ONR), a sponsor of SIMDIS development
- Interactive Scenario Builder
