= Office of Naval Research =

Office within the United States Department of the Navy

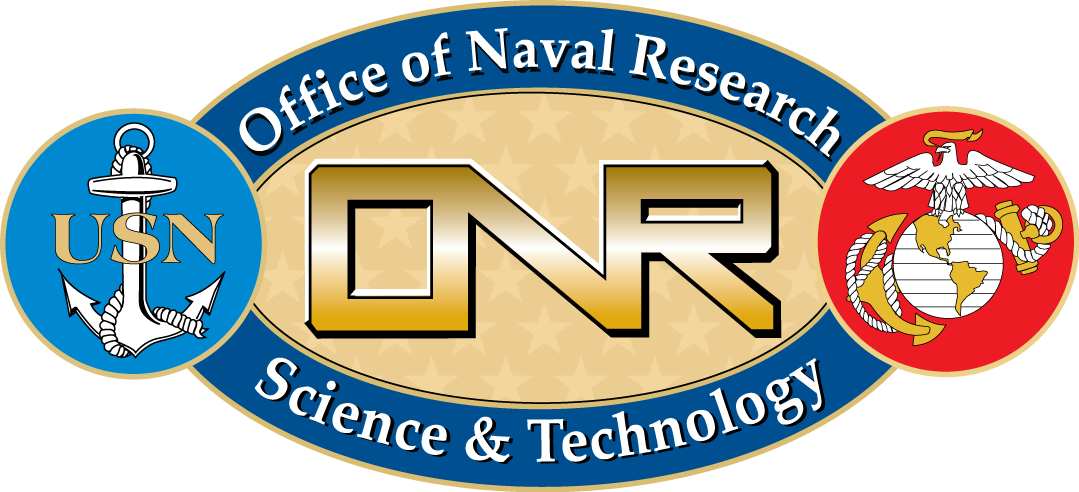

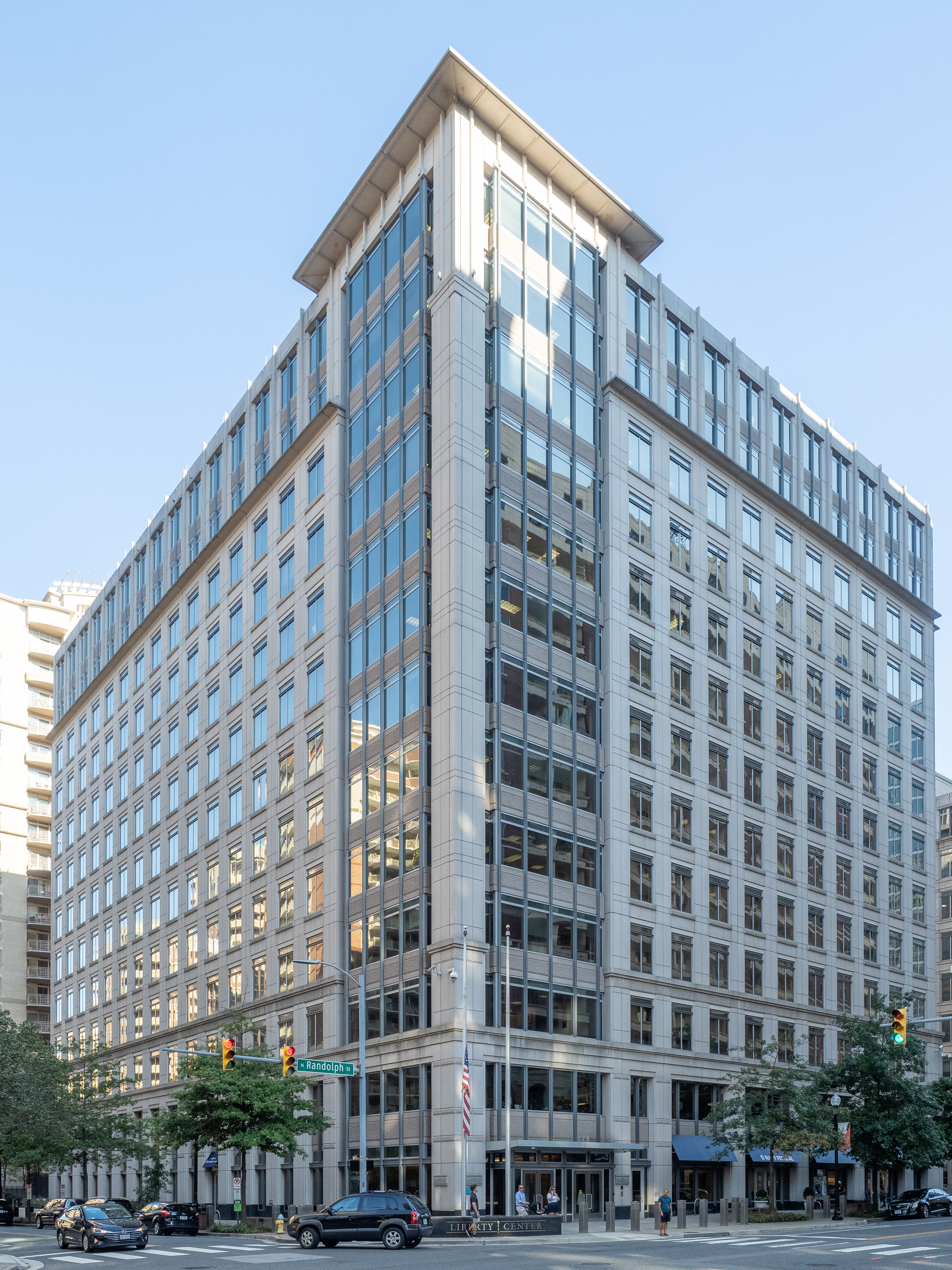
- The headquarters of the Office of Naval Research in Ballston, Virginia in 2022
- Abbreviation: ONR
- Formation: August 1, 1946; 80 years ago
- Headquarters: Ballston, Virginia, U.S.
- Coordinates: 38.8808°N 77.1086°W
- Secretary General: U.S. Secretary of the Navy
- Chief of Naval Research: Thomas C. Fu (acting)
- Parent organization: United States Department of the Navy
- Subsidiaries: United States Naval Research Laboratory
- Website: www.onr.navy.mil

The Office of Naval Research (ONR) is an organization within the United States Department of the Navy responsible for the science and technology programs of the U.S. Navy and Marine Corps. Established by Congress in 1946, its mission is to plan, foster, and encourage scientific research to maintain future naval power and preserve national security. It carries this out through funding and collaboration with schools, universities, government laboratories, nonprofit organizations, and for-profit organizations, and overseeing the Naval Research Laboratory, the corporate research laboratory for the Navy and Marine Corps. NRL conducts a broad program of scientific research, technology and advanced development.

ONR's headquarters is in the Ballston neighborhood of Arlington County, Virginia. ONR Global has offices overseas in Santiago, São Paulo, London, Prague, Singapore, and Tokyo.

== Overview ==
The ONR was authorized by an Act of Congress, Public Law 588, and subsequently approved by President Harry S. Truman on August 1, 1946. Its stated mission is "planning, fostering, and encouraging scientific research in recognition of its paramount importance as related to the maintenance of future naval power and the preservation of national security."

The ONR carries this out through funding with grants and contracts scientists and engineers who perform basic research, technology development, and advanced technology demonstrations.

ONR's Science and Technology Portfolio is allocated as follows: "10% Quick Reaction & Other S&T, 30% Acquisition Enablers, 10% Leap Ahead Innovations, 40% Discovery & Invention (Basic and Applied Science), 10% Other."

== Organization ==
ONR reports to the U.S. secretary of the Navy through the assistant secretary of the Navy for research, development and acquisition. The chief of naval research is Dr. Thoms C. Fu and the vice chief of naval research is Brigadier General Dustin J. Byrum, United States Marine Corps, who also serves as Director of United States Marine Corps Futures Directorate and Commanding General of the United States Marine Corps Warfighting Laboratory.

ONR executes its mission through science and technology departments, corporate programs, the Naval Research Laboratory (NRL), and the ONR Global office.

=== Science and Technology Departments ===
ONR has six science and technology departments that support a broad range of subjects, which span such efforts as combating terrorism, oceanography, sea warfare, and life sciences. These fund basic research programs, primarily through U.S. universities; technology research programs, primarily through government and nongovernment laboratories; and advanced technology demonstration programs, primarily through U.S. industry and companies.

Additionally, ONR has an Office of Transition that supports technology transitions to the Navy and Marine Corps; a Small Business Innovative Research Office that encourages small businesses to develop and commercialize products in support of ONR’s mission; a Future Naval Capabilities Program that works to provide technologies to close warfighting gaps; and a Corporate Programs Office that supports cross-disciplinary research and education programs. As of February, 2020, ONR oversees NavalX, the US Navy Agility Cell founded by James “Hondo” Geurts in 2018.

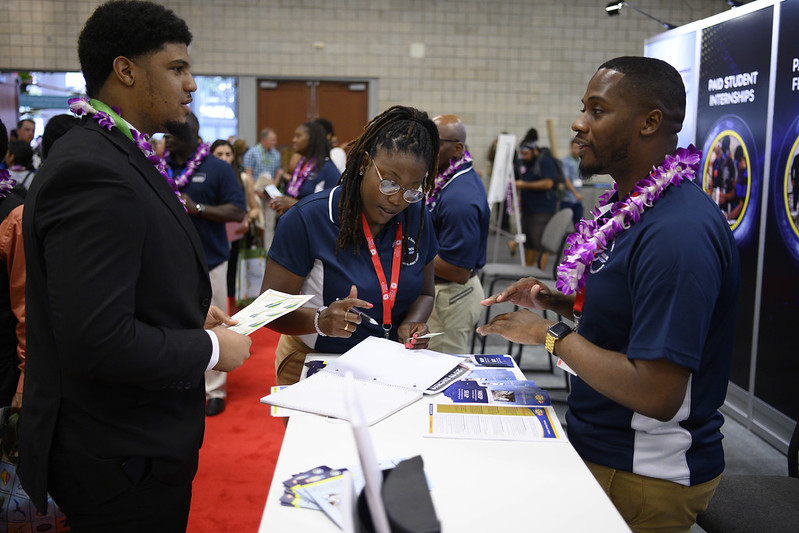
ONR staffer discusses paid internship opportunities with a visitor to the Department of the Navy Historically Black Colleges and Universities/Minority Institutions (HBCU/MI) Program exhibit.

=== ONR Corporate Programs: Research & Education ===
ONR supports many corporate research and education programs, including:

- Naval Research Enterprise Intern Program (NREIP)
- Multidisciplinary Research Program of the URI (MURI)
- Defense University Research Instrumentation Program (DURIP) of the URI
- DoD Experimental Program to Stimulate Competitive Research (DEPSCOR)
- Young Investigator Program
- DoD National Defense Science and Engineering Graduate (NDSEG) Fellowship Program of the URI
- Summer Faculty Research Program
- Faculty Sabbatical Leave Program
- Naval High School Science Awards Program
- HBCU (Historically Black Colleges/Universities) Future Engineering Faculty Fellowship Program
- HBCU/Minority Institutions Program
- Science and Engineering Apprentice Program (SEAP) (Run by ONR, funded by the American Society for Engineering Education)
- Science, Mathematics, And Research For Transformation (SMART) Defense Scholarship Program

=== Naval Research Laboratory ===
The Naval Research Laboratory (NRL) was founded in 1923 and employed over 2,500 scientists and engineers as of 2017. NRL is the corporate research laboratory for the Navy and Marine Corps and conducts a broad program of scientific research, technology and advanced development. It has a prestigious history, including the development of the first U.S. radar system, synthetic lubricants (for modern gas turbine engines), over-the-horizon radar, the first U.S. surveillance satellite, and the Clementine space mission. A few of the Laboratory's current specialties include plasma physics, space physics, materials science, and tactical electronic warfare.

=== ONR Global ===
ONR Global regional offices are located in:

- RAF Blenheim Crescent, London, U.K. (Europe)
- Santiago, Chile (Latin America)
- Tokyo, Japan (Asia/Pacific)
- Australia (Asia/Pacific)
- Singapore (South Asia/Singapore)
- Prague, Czech Republic (Europe)

ONR Global is a supporter of the Global Security Challenge at the London Business School.

== Research ==
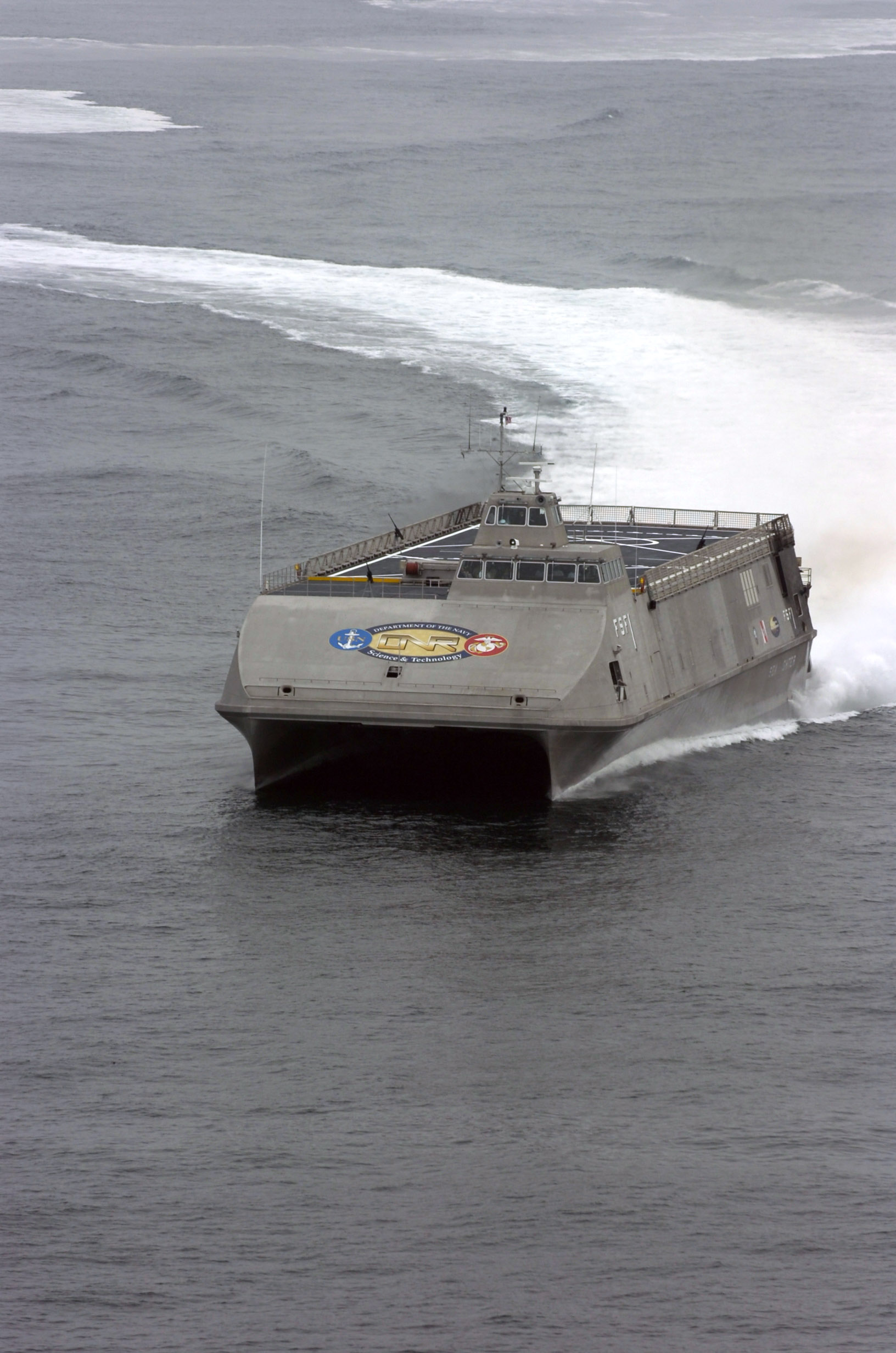
Sea Fighter (FSF-1), August 2005

ONR's investments have enabled many firsts, including the launch of the first U.S. intel satellite; the development of SEALAB I/II; the validation of the GPS concept and launch of the first GPS satellite; the first global atmospheric prediction model; GWOT support through various quick response programs; and, most recently, the electromagnetic railgun, the Infantry Immersive Trainer, and super-conducting motors. Others include:

- Combat Tactical Vehicle (Technology Demonstrator)
- ULTRA AP
- Shadow RST-V
- Sea Fighter
- Quiet Electric Drive
- R/P FLIP
- CALDIC (California Digital Computer) – from 1951 to 1955
- Biomimetic anti-fouling ship coatings
- Ocean thermal energy conversion(OTEC or OTE)
- Large Vessel Interface Lift-on/Lift-off

The ONR has also sponsored symposia such as the Symposium on Principles of Self-Organization at Allerton Park in 1960.

=== ONR projects and programs ===
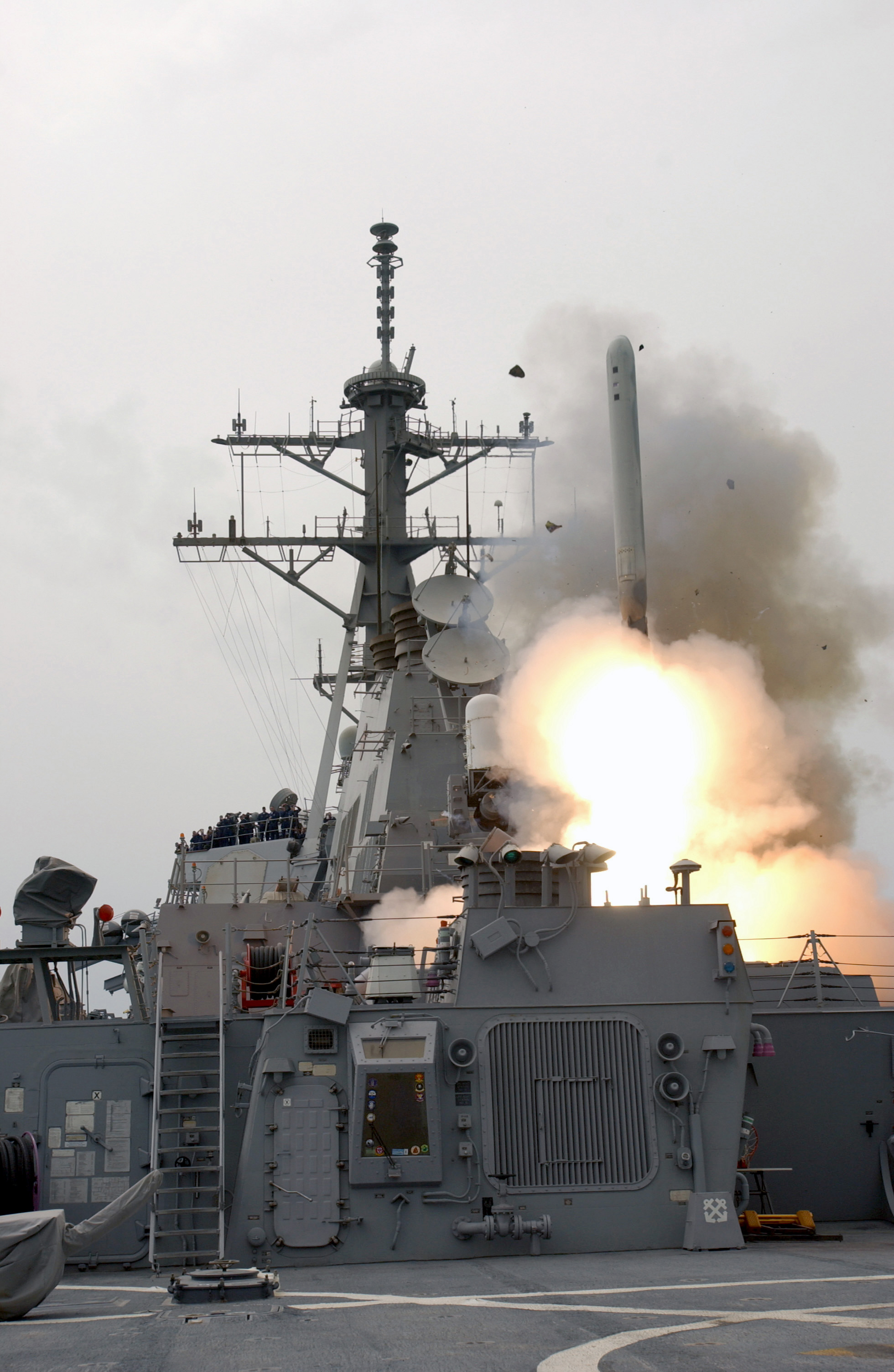
Tomahawk TLAM missile launching

- BGM-109 Tomahawk
- Infantry Immersion Trainer
- Interactive Scenario Builder (Tactical Environmental Simulation)
- High Frequency Active Auroral Research Program
- HMMWV replacement process
- Massive Multiplayer Online Wargame Leveraging the Internet
- SIMDIS

==== Alleged ====
- Philadelphia Experiment: Said to have been conducted in 1943, three years prior to the establishment of ONR.

== See also ==
Related organizations and agencies

- United States Naval Research Laboratory
- Naval Submarine Medical Research Laboratory
- Naval Research Advisory Committee
- United States Army Research Laboratory
- Air Force Research Laboratory
- Fleet Electronic Warfare Center (FEWC)
- National Oceanic and Atmospheric Administration
- University-National Oceanographic Laboratory System
- List of auxiliaries of the United States Navy
