= Fleet Electronic Warfare Center =

Echelon IV component of the U.S. Navy

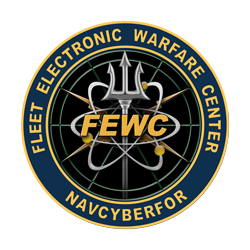
- Fleet Electronic Warfare Center logo
- Active: 2008 - present
- Country: United States of America
- Allegiance: United States Armed Forces
- Branch: United States Navy Seal
- Type: Subordinate Element
- Garrison/HQ: Joint Expeditionary Base Little Creek-Fort Story, Virginia

Commanders
- Director: CAPT Gregg Smith USN

The Fleet Electronic Warfare Center (FEWC) is a subordinate organization of the Naval Network Warfare Command (NNWC), which was established in 2008 to be the center for US Navy fleet electronic warfare (EW) operational and tactical issues. It is currently located at Navy Information Dominance Forces (NIDF) Headquarters, in Suffolk, VA as an independent directorate.

== Background ==
The demand for a focus on EW is greater than ever before. Recent operations throughout the world, and in particular Iraq and Afghanistan, have highlighted the crucial EW support required by the Joint Force Commander. These challenges have a direct application on the ability to perform Navy missions.

The impetus for the establishment of the FEWC began in 2005 when the Chief of Naval Operations offered Navy EW expertise to Army leadership to counter a growing, deadly threat from Radio Controlled Improvised Explosive Devices (RCIEDs) to the Joint fight in Iraq. This resulted in the formation of Joint CREW (Counter RCIED Electronic Warfare) Composite Squadron ONE (JCCS-1). The Navy has deployed hundreds of EW-qualified Sailors on Individual Augmentation (IA) assignments to Operation Iraqi Freedom and Operation Enduring Freedom with significant success. This successful application of EW into the fight highlights the positive impact that EW has on the battlefield, and just as importantly, how a lack of EW capability could impair US combat capability.

In May 2007, NNWC conducted the Navy EW Study to provide a foundation for the development of a strategic implementation plan. The study gave a comprehensive overview of the organizational challenges facing Fleet EW and some of the negative consequences incurred as a result of those challenges. Over 40 interviews were conducted with Fleet EW stakeholders from Echelon I, II, III, and IV commands including operational commands, resource sponsors, acquisition and procurement, research & development, doctrine development, fleet training and individual training. These stakeholder interviews also involved all major warfare communities - Air, Surface, Submarine, Expeditionary, and information warfare. The results of the Navy EW Study culminated in the development of a value chain focusing on the following areas: Fleet EW Integration, EW Capabilities & Requirements, EW Training, EW Force Management, and EW Doctrine/TTP & Policy. This value chain and the results of the stakeholder analysis led to the development of a series of strategic goals, objectives, and initiatives as well as the formation of the FEWC whose sole mission is focused on the improvement of Fleet EW readiness.

== Purpose ==
The FEWC has three major roles:

1. Consistently maintain visibility and current, accurate information on EW and Spectrum challenges.
2. Perform the management functions required to enable the EW Readiness Group (EWRG) to resolve deficiencies and, through the Commander, Navy ID Forces, advise the Fleet Commander.
3. Act as the Fleet's EW/Spectrum "DC Central" to thoroughly coordinate answers to emergent requirements from higher echelon commanders for all Fleet operational EW. The coordination spans across all naval platforms—air, surface, subsurface and expeditionary—and across doctrine, organization, training, material, leadership and education, personnel and facilities (DOTMLPF).

The FEWC also provides for operational control of the Navy and Marine Corps Spectrum Center to handle operational spectrum issues in the electromagnetic battlespace across the globe.

== FEWC and EWRG structure ==
To effectively organize the FEWC, NIDF, as the Operational Agent for EW, leads Fleet EW stakeholders into a cohesive team by facilitating coordination and collaboration efforts among the organizations that influence Fleet EW readiness. To that end, NNWC previously established the EW Integration & Improvement Program (EWIIP), which is the formal process to identify Fleet-centric EW issues and deficiencies and generate an annual EW Integrated Priority Capabilities List (IPCL) to prioritize operational Fleet EW requirements to improve Fleet EW readiness. Navy Cyber Forces (NCF) modified the original structure by establishing the EW Readiness Group (EWRG) to focus on specific elements of EW readiness. The EWRG consists of Fleet EW stakeholder command or organization representatives who are responsible for identifying and promulgating Fleet EW priorities through EWRG members' familiarity with their command's or organization's EW capabilities and requirements. The ultimate goal of the EWIIP is to improve the capability, capacity and readiness of Fleet EW. The EWRG will identify EW capability gaps across doctrine, organization, training, materiel, leadership, personnel, and facilities (DOTMLPF) and provide readiness recommendations and mitigating actions in support of the Planning, Programming, Budgeting and Execution (PPBE) process. These EW capability gaps and recommendations are then reviewed for their applicability to resolve operational Fleet EW requirements. Currently there are four standing EWRGs:

1. Doctrine & Tactics (D&T), which develops recommendations for changes to existing doctrine and tactics, techniques and procedures (TTP) and for new doctrine and TTP in response to emerging threats and technology.
2. Training & Exercises (T&E), responsible for identifying unit and strike group Fleet Response Training Plan (FRTP) training and exercise readiness shortfalls and identifying solutions to existing and emerging training and exercise capability/capacity gaps.
3. Equipment & Experimentation (E&E), tasked to review EW material capability, maintenance and facility gaps, and determine utility and maturity of emerging/enabling technologies in response to threat based assessments of emerging threat technology.
4. Workforce Development (WD), responsible for identifying EW manning and leadership/education shortfalls and solutions to existing and emerging manning and leadership/education capability/capacity gaps.

ERGs meet during the Fall EWIIP Symposium, focusing on assessing the state of EW and spectrum capabilities and potential gaps in capabilities. This assessment provides the analytical rigor supporting follow-on DOTMLPF changes which address operational capability and capacity gaps in the EW IPCL.

== See also ==
- Electronic warfare
- Directed-energy weapon
- Improvised Explosive Device
- EA-6B Prowler
- EA-18G Growler
- EP-3 Aries II
- AN/SLQ-32 Electronic Warfare Suite
- ELINT
- Electronic Warfare Officer
- Electronic countermeasures
- Electromagnetic bomb
- Joint Electronic Warfare Center
- Office of Naval Research
- United States Naval Research Laboratory
- COMSUBLANT
- United States Fleet Forces Command
- Battle of Latakia
- Battle of the Beams
- Association of Old Crows
