= VXS-1 =

Scientific Development Squadron (VXS) 1
- VXS-1 Insignia
- Active: December 2004 – present
- Country: United States
- Branch: USN
- Nickname: Warlocks

Commanders
- Commander: CDR Andrew R. Vawter
- Commander: CDR Christopher Calvanico

Scientific Development Squadron 1 (VXS-1) is a United States Navy military support squadron that conducts numerous single-aircraft deployments around the world in support of a wide range of airborne research projects for the U.S. Naval Research Laboratory, United States Navy, U.S. Government, and its contracting agencies.

== Mission statement ==
"Scientific Development Squadron (VXS) 1 conducts airborne scientific experimentation and advanced technology development in worldwide operations supporting U.S. Navy and national science and technology (S&T) priorities and war fighting goals. Supporting broadly based, multidisciplinary programs across the full spectrum of scientific research and applied technologies, our focus is toward the maritime application of new and improved airborne data collection techniques, experimental equipment, and system demonstration. While directly supporting scientific programs across the globe, we ensure that our work environment provides for the learning, personal growth, and respect of all our men and women and their families."

== History ==
Formerly known as Flight Support Detachment, VXS-1 was established 13 December 2004, as commissioned by the Office of the Chief of Naval Operations, Notice 5450.

== Fleet Operations ==
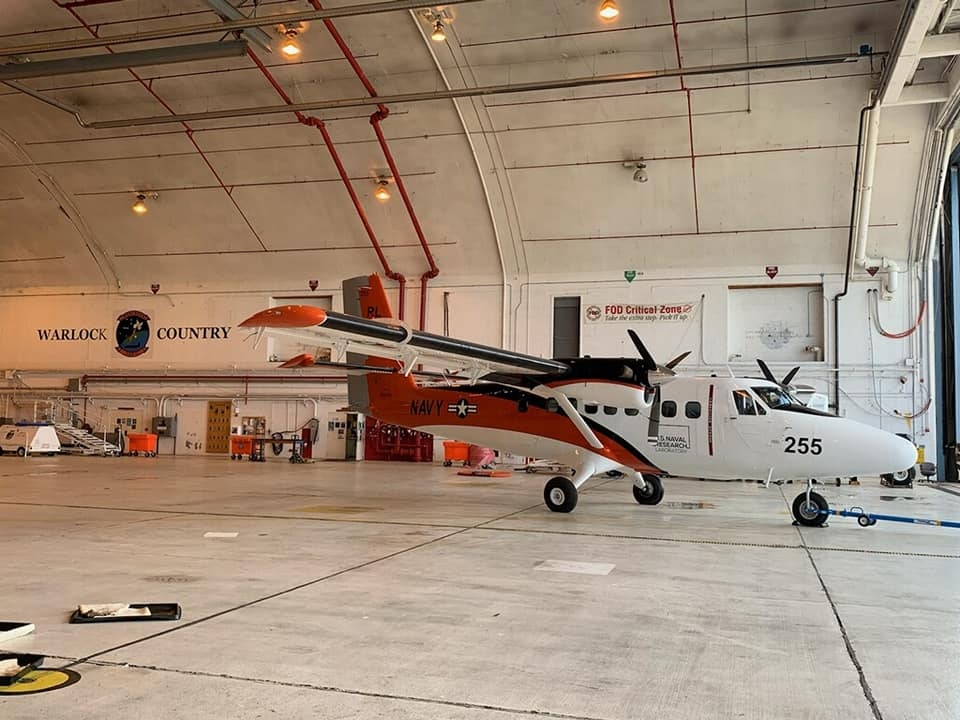
The UV-18 is the military equivalent of the DeHavilland DHC-6 – a high-wing, unpressurized twin engine turbine powered aircraft with fixed tricycle landing gear.

Manned by Navy officers, enlisted sailors and government and private civilian personnel, the squadron is responsible for the maintenance and security of three uniquely configured NP-3C Orion turboprop research aircraft, a Beechcraft RC-12M Guardrail aircraft, and numerous TigerShark Unmanned Aerial Vehicles (UAVs). In 2019 VXS-1 acquired a UV-18 Twin Otter aircraft, the military equivalent of the DeHavilland DHC-6 – a high-wing, unpressurized twin engine turbine powered aircraft with fixed tricycle landing gear.

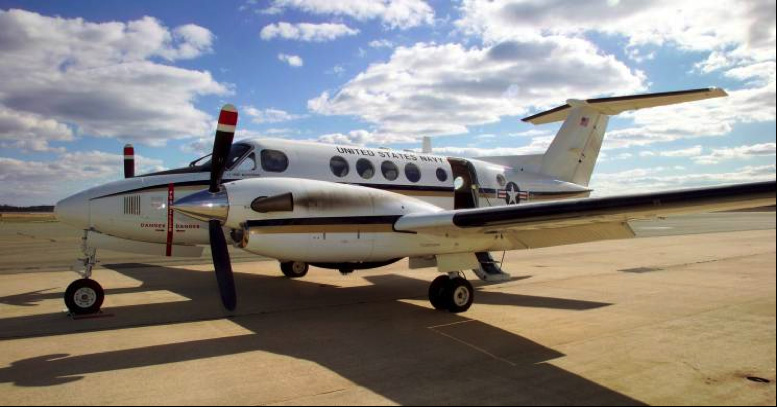
The RC-12M is a medium-altitude, medium endurance aircraft modified to rapidly integrate science and technology projects.

Located on board the Naval Air Station Patuxent River, Maryland, VXS-1 is responsible for the training, qualifications, and proficiency of all assigned personnel, as well as the maintenance of the research aircraft, and detachment coordination.

== Missions ==
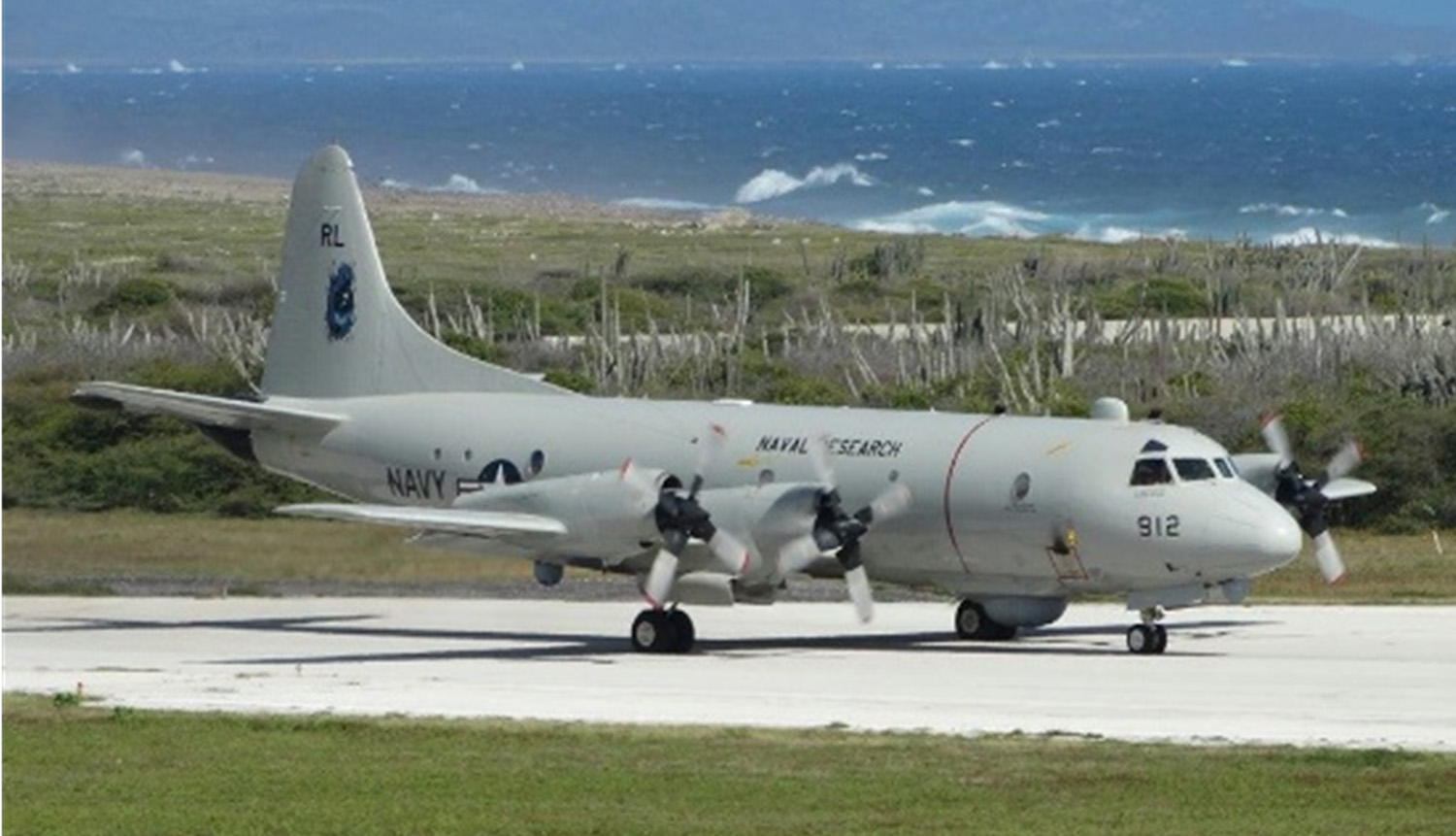
NRL, VXS-1 maintains a fleet of two uniquely configured, research modified NP-3C "Orion" aircraft.

2004 – The Detachment supported the Antarctic Sea Ice Campaign, flying missions in and around what was formerly known as the Palmer Peninsula on the Antarctic continent. The mission purpose was the evaluation of spatial variability to fully assess how accurately sea ice parameters can be derived based on a study of new ice emissivity, heat, and salinity fluxes over coastal waters and a determination of precise locations of ice edges.

2006 – VXS-1 flew the "Rampant Lion I" survey conducted by Naval Research Laboratory and U.S. Geological Survey scientists as part of an integrated remote sensing survey, mapping approximately two-thirds of the country of Afghanistan.

2008 – The team flew "Rampant Lion II". Built on data obtained in 2006, the team's modified NP-3D Orion aircraft assisted scientists with a dual focus – developing advanced geospatial collection; and analysis techniques to support the warfighter and economic infrastructure development in Afghanistan.
