= United States Naval Research Laboratory =

U.S. Navy research laboratory

U.S. Naval Research Laboratory
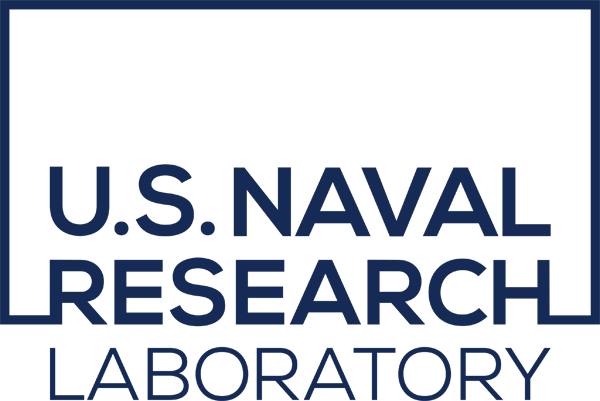

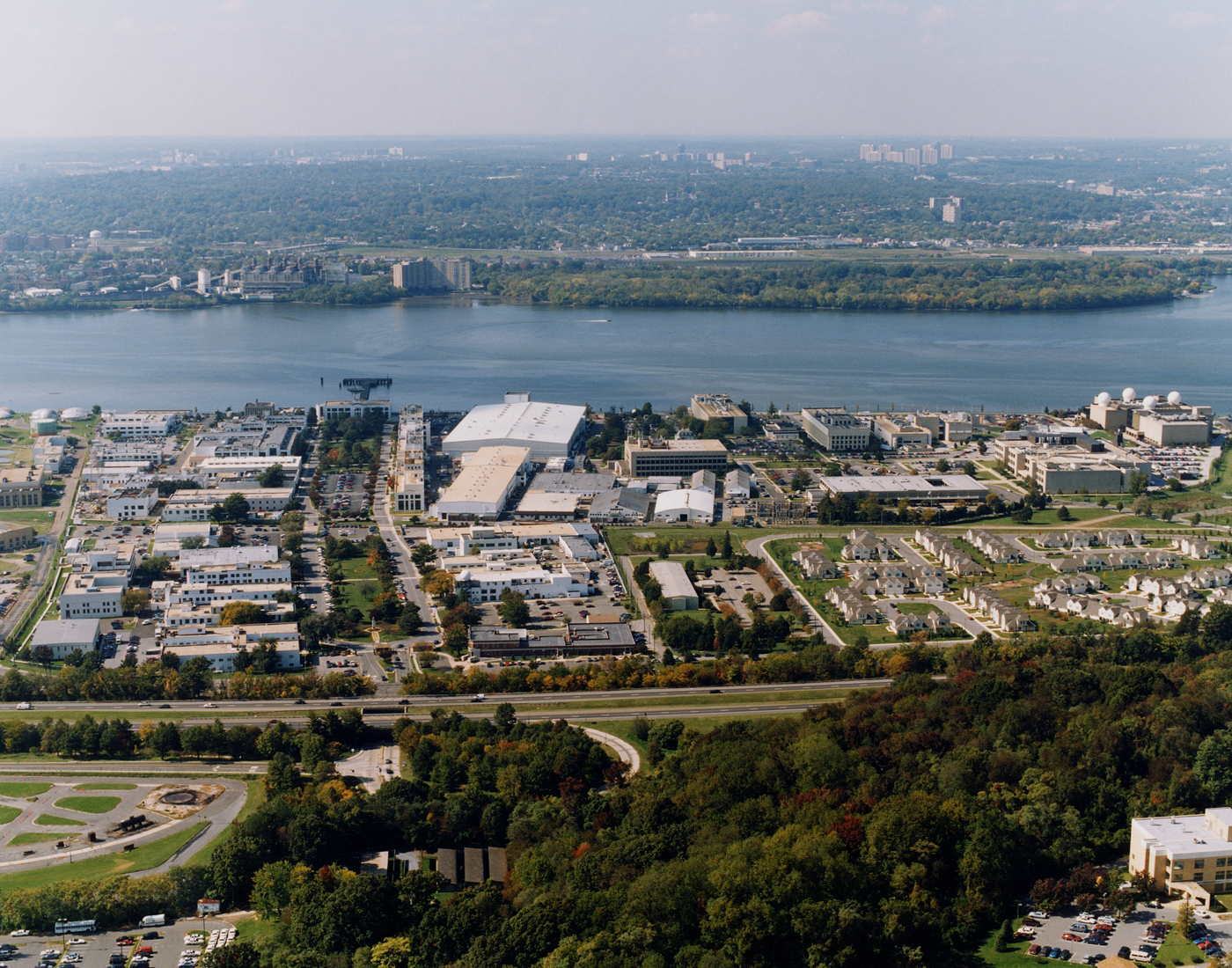
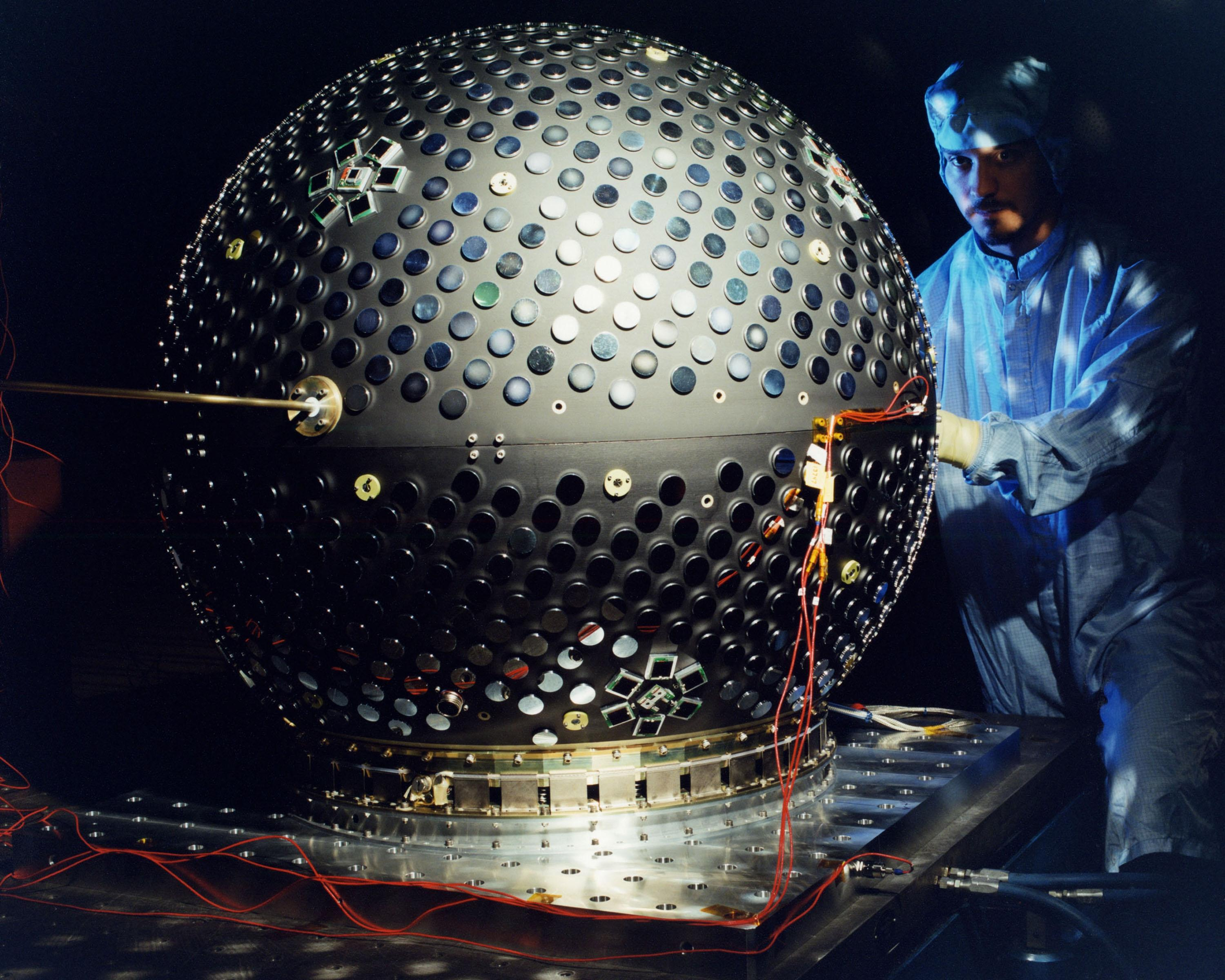
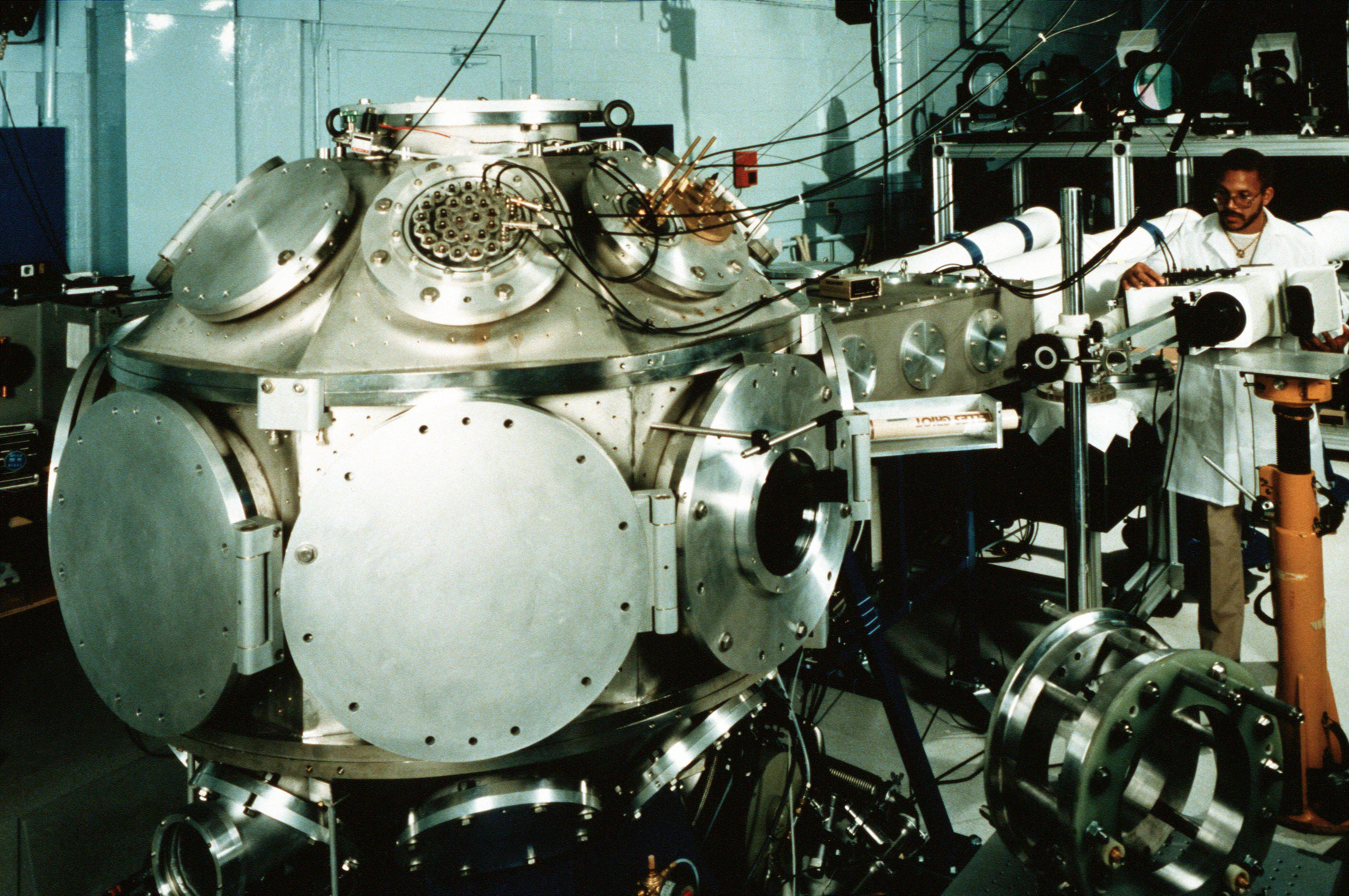
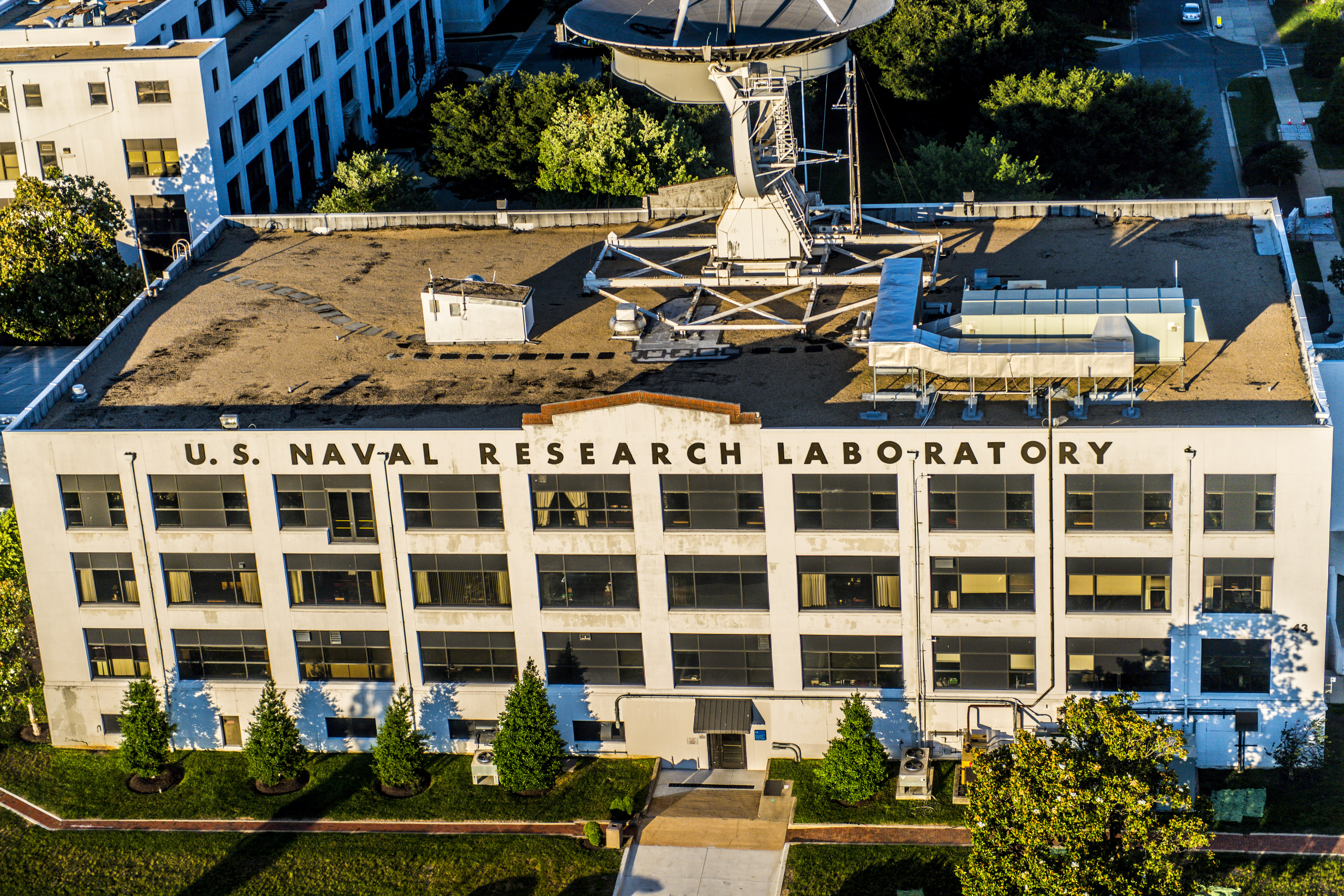
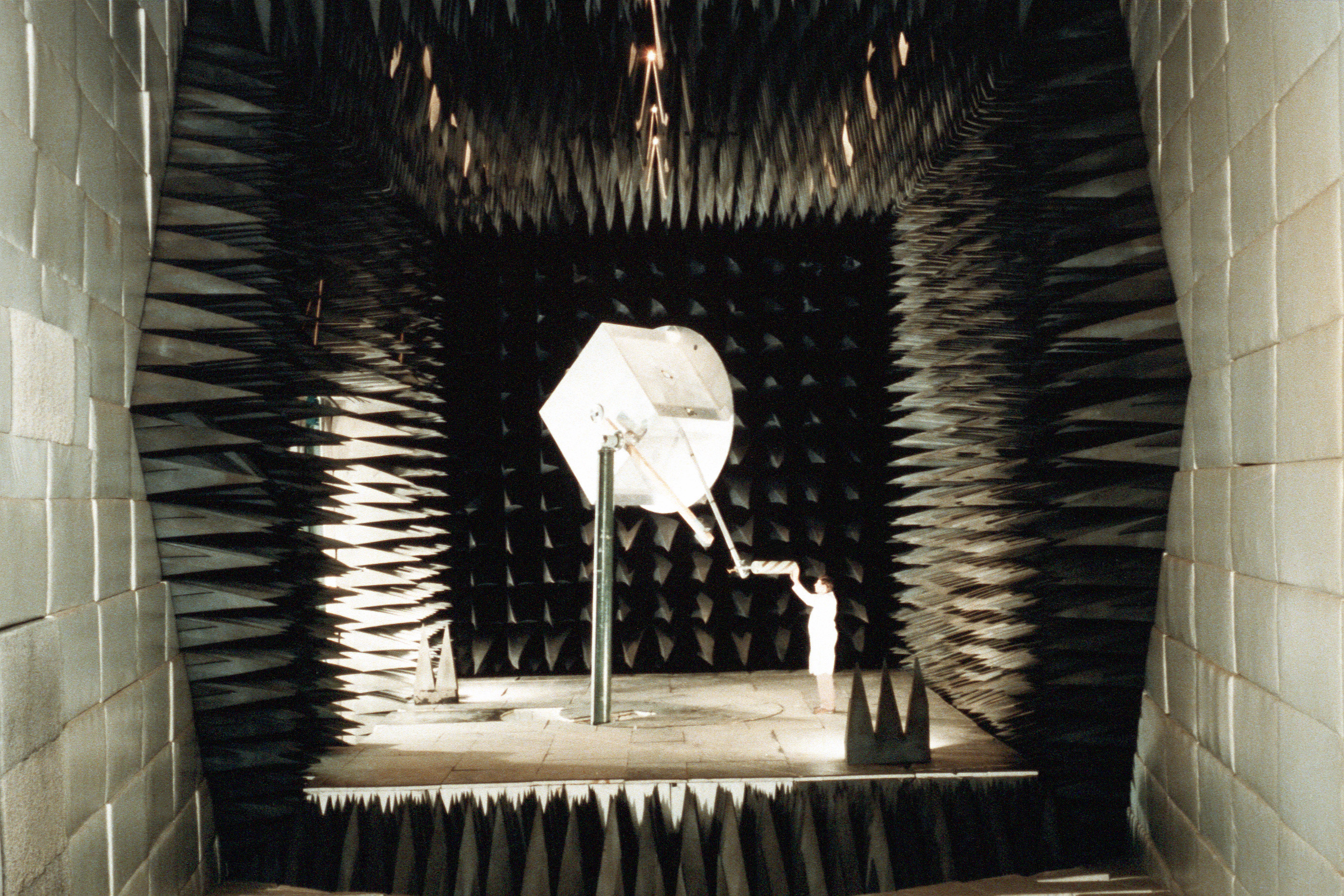
- Clockwise from the top: Aerial view of NRL, Pharos III laser, Payload Checkout Facility, Building 43, Starshine 3 Satellite
- Established: 1923
- Research type: Basic and Applied Research
- Budget: $1.1 billion
- Field of research: National security; Fundamental science
- Director: Dr. Bruce Danly
- Staff: 2,538 civilian 86 military (2015)
- Location: Washington, D.C., United States; 38°49′21″N 77°01′30″W
U.S. Naval Research Laboratory
- Active: 1923–present
- Country: United States
- Branch: United States Navy; United States Marine Corps
- Type: Research
- Website: nrl.navy.mil
Commanders
- Commanding Officer (CO): CAPT Randy C. Cruz
- Director of Research: Dr. Bruce Danly
- Executive Officer (XO): CAPT Sarah B. Rice

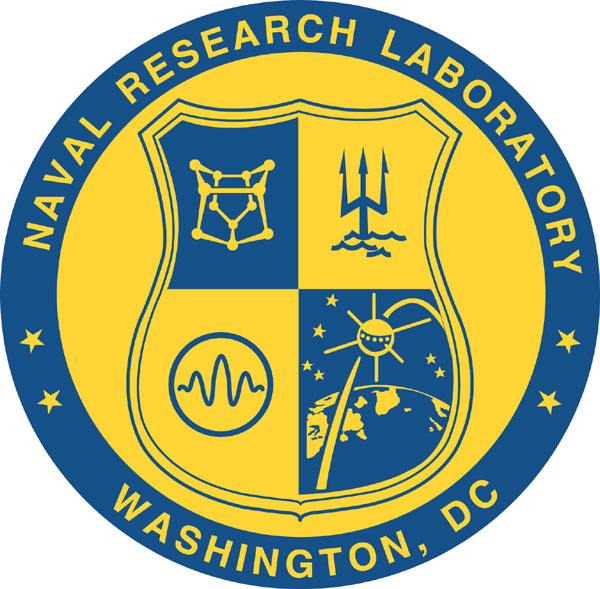
Naval Research Laboratory seal

The United States Naval Research Laboratory (NRL) is the corporate research laboratory for the United States Navy and the United States Marine Corps. Located in Washington, DC, it was founded in 1923 and conducts basic scientific research, applied research, technological development and prototyping. The laboratory's specialties include plasma physics, space physics, materials science, and tactical electronic warfare. NRL is one of the first US government scientific R&D laboratories, having opened in 1923 at the instigation of Thomas Edison, and is currently under the Office of Naval Research.

For many decades, the NRL has been (and remains) a Navy Working Capital Fund activity, which means it is not a line-item in the US Federal Budget. Instead of direct funding from Congress, all costs, including overhead, were recovered through sponsor-funded research projects. NRL's research expenditures were approximately $1 billion per year.

== Research ==
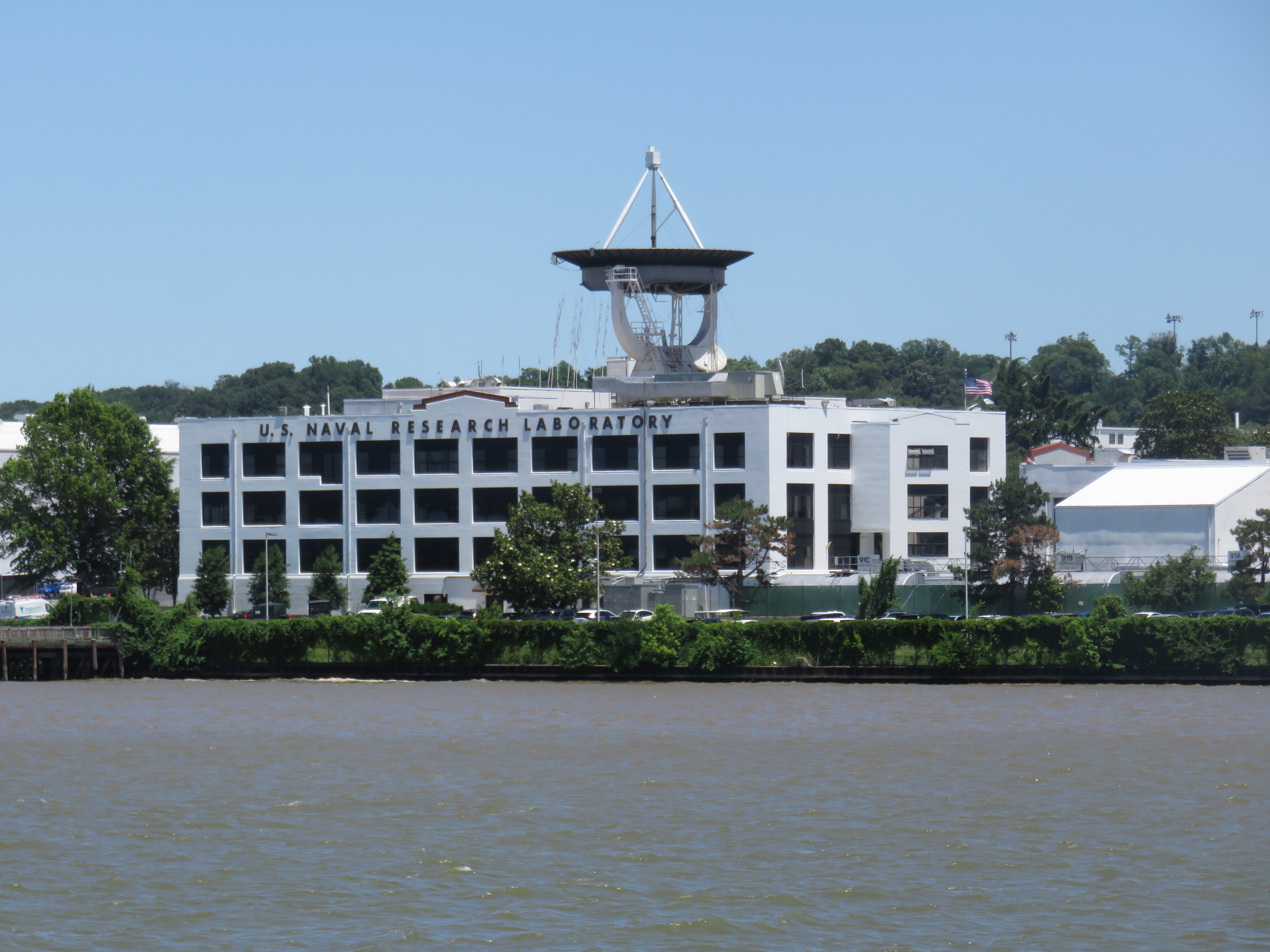
Part of the Naval Research Laboratory main campus in Washington, D.C. The prominent dish antenna is often used as a symbol of the laboratory.

The Naval Research Laboratory conducts a wide variety of basic research and applied research relevant to the US Navy.

It has a history of scientific breakthroughs and technological achievements dating back to its foundation in 1923. In some instances the laboratory's contributions to military technology have been declassified decades after those technologies have become widely adopted.

NRL scientists and engineers typically write over 1200 openly published research papers in a wide range of conferences, symposia, and journals every year. For example, in 2011, NRL researchers published 1,398 unclassified scientific and technical articles, book chapters and conference proceedings. In 2008, the NRL was ranked 3rd among all U.S. institutions holding nanotechnology-related patents, behind IBM and the University of California.

Current areas of research at NRL include, for example:

- Advanced radio, optical and infrared sensors
- Autonomous systems
- Computer science, cognitive science, and artificial intelligence
- Communications Technology (e.g., radio, networking, optical transmission)
- Directed energy technology
- Electronic electro-optical device technology
- Electronic warfare
- Enhanced maintainability, reliability and survivability technology
- Environmental effects on naval systems
- Human-robot interaction
- Imaging research and systems
- Information Security
- Marine geosciences
- Materials
- Meteorology
- Ocean acoustics
- Oceanography
- Optical physics
- Plasma physics
- Space systems and technology
- Surveillance and sensor technology
- Undersea technology

In 2014, the NRL was researching: armor for munitions in transport, high-powered lasers, remote explosives detection, spintronics, the dynamics of explosive gas mixtures, electromagnetic railgun technology, detection of hidden nuclear materials, graphene devices, high-power extremely high frequency (35–220 GHz) amplifiers, acoustic lensing, information-rich orbital coastline mapping, arctic weather forecasting, global aerosol analysis & prediction, high-density plasmas, millisecond pulsars, broadband laser data links, virtual mission operation centers, battery technology, photonic crystals, carbon nanotube electronics, electronic sensors, mechanical nano-resonators, solid-state chemical sensors, organic opto-electronics, neural-electronic interfaces and self-assembling nanostructures.

The laboratory includes a range of R&D facilities. 2014 additions included the NRL Nanoscience Institute's 5,000 sq ft (460 m^{2}) Class 100 nanofabrication cleanroom; quiet and ultra-quiet measurement labs; and the Laboratory for Autonomous Systems Research (LASR).

== Notable accomplishments ==
=== Space sciences ===
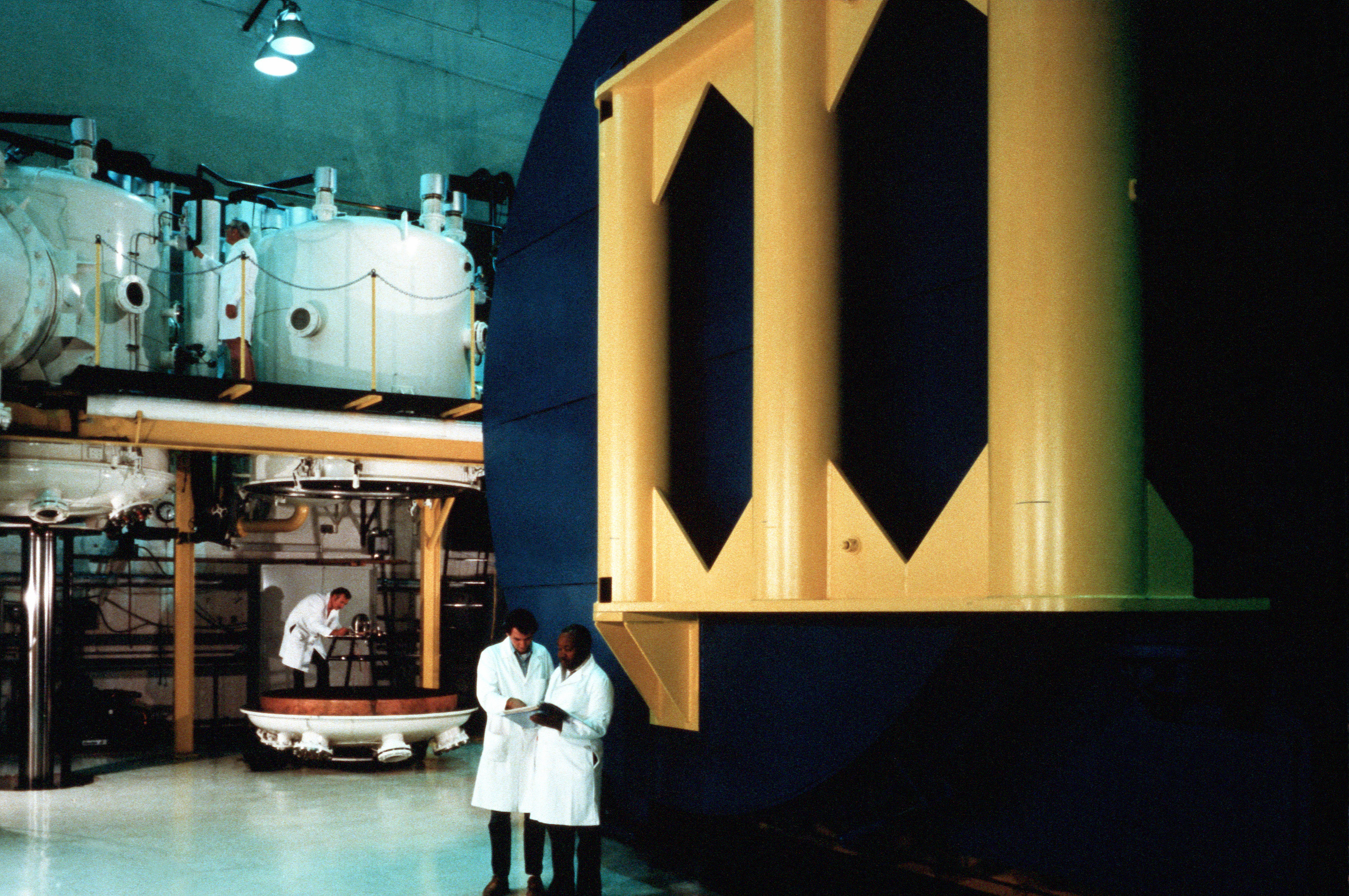
16-foot thermal vacuum chamber in the Payload Checkout Facility at the Naval Research Laboratory.

The Naval Research Laboratory has a long history of spacecraft development. This includes the second, fifth and seventh American satellites in Earth orbit, the first solar-powered satellite, the first surveillance satellite, the first meteorological satellite and the first GPS satellite.

Project Vanguard, the first American satellite program, tasked NRL with the design, construction and launch of an artificial satellite, which was accomplished in 1958. As of 2024, Vanguard I and its upper launch stage are still in orbit, making them the longest-lived man-made satellites. Vanguard II was the first satellite to observe the Earth's cloud cover and therefore the first meteorological satellite.

NRL's Galactic Radiation and Background I (GRAB I) was the first U.S. intelligence satellite, mapping out Soviet radar networks from space. The Global Positioning System (GPS) was invented at NRL and tested by NRL's Timation series of satellites. The first operational GPS satellite, Timation IV (NTS-II) was designed and constructed at NRL.

NRL pioneered the study of the sun Ultraviolet and X-Ray spectrum and continues to contribute to the field with satellites like Coriolis launched in 2003. NRL is also responsible for the Tactical Satellite Program with spacecraft launched in 2006, 2009 and 2011.

The NRL designed the first satellite tracking system, Minitrack, which became the prototype for future satellite tracking networks. Prior to the success of surveillance satellites, the iconic parabolic antenna atop NRL's main headquarters in Washington, D.C. was part of Communication Moon Relay, a project that utilized signals bounced off the Moon both for long-distance communications research and surveillance of internal Soviet transmissions during the Cold War.

NRL's spacecraft development program continues today with the TacSat-4 experimental tactical reconnaissance and communication satellite. In addition to spacecraft design, NRL designs and operates spaceborne research instruments and experiments, such as the Strontium Iodide Radiation Instrumentation (SIRI) and RAM Angle and Magnetic field sensor (RAMS) aboard STPSat-5, the Wide-field Imager for Solar PRobe (WISPR) aboard the Parker Solar Probe, and the Large Angle and Spectrometric Coronagraph Experiment (LASCO) aboard the Solar and Heliospheric Observatory (SOHO). NASA's Fermi Gamma-ray Space Telescope (FGST) [formerly called Gamma-ray Large Area Space Telescope (GLAST)] was tested at NRL spacecraft testing facilities, and NRL built its calorimeter, a major subsystem. NRL scientists have most recently contributed leading research to the study of novas and gamma ray bursts.

=== Meteorology ===
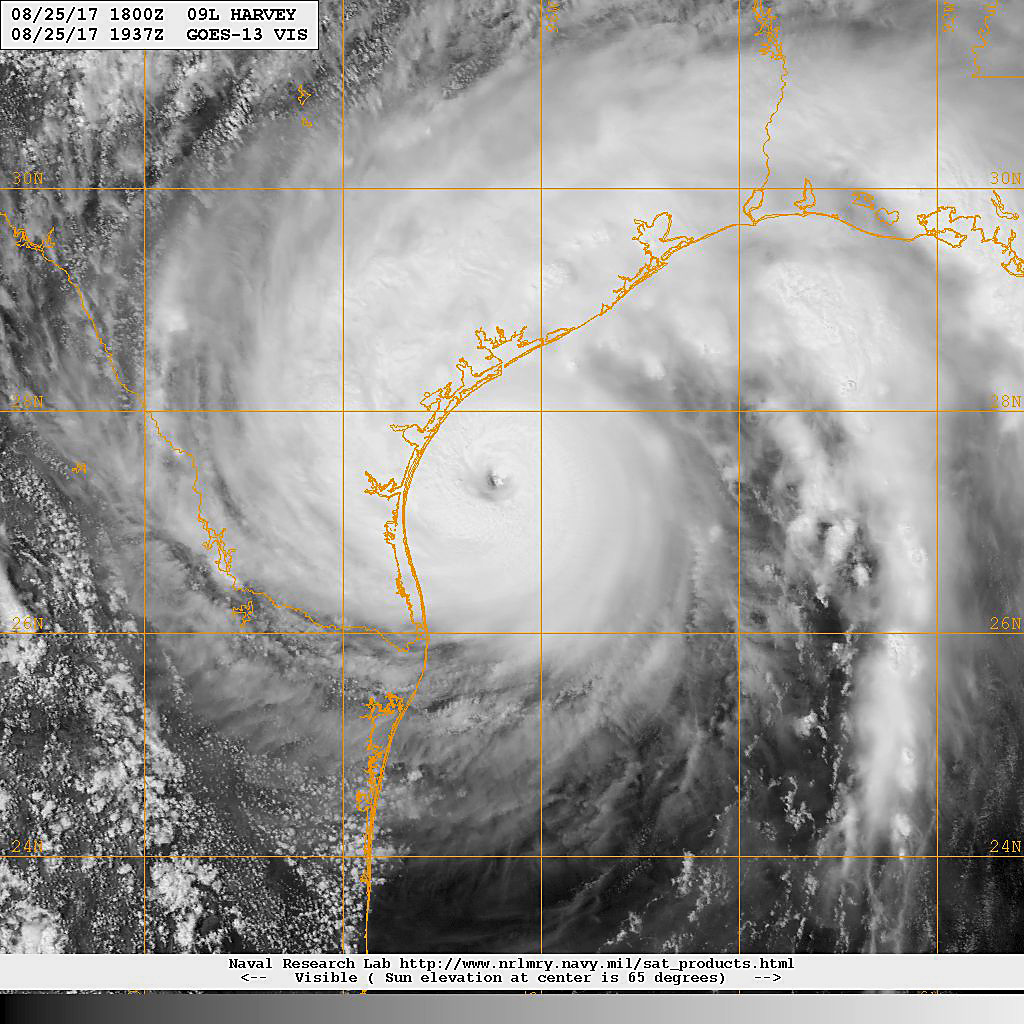
NRL satellite image of hurricane Harvey just prior to landfall on the Texas coast, 2017.

The Marine Meteorology Division (Naval Research Lab–Monterey, also known as "NRL–MRY"), located in Monterey, California, contributes to weather forecasting in the United States and around the world by publishing imagery from 18 weather satellites. Satellite images of severe weather (e.g. hurricanes and cyclones) that are used for advanced warning often originate from NRL–MRY, as seen in 2017 during Hurricane Harvey. NRL is also involved in weather forecasting models such as the Hurricane Weather Research and Forecasting model released in 2007.

=== Materials science ===
NRL has a long history of contributions to materials science, dating back to the use of Industrial radiography with gamma rays for the nondestructive inspection of metal casings and welds on Navy vessels beginning in the 1920s. Modern mechanical fracture mechanics were pioneered at NRL and were subsequently applied to solve fracture problems in Navy vessels, commercial aircraft and Polaris missiles. That knowledge is in widespread use today in applications ranging from design of nuclear reactors to aircraft, submarines and toxic material storage tanks.

NRL developed the synthesis of high-purity GaAs crystals used in a myriad of modern high frequency transceivers including cellular phones, satellite communication systems, commercial and military radar systems including those aboard all US combat aircraft and ARM, Phoenix, AIM-9L and AMRAAM missiles. NRL's GaAs inventions were licensed by Rockwell, Westinghouse, Texas Instruments and Hughes Research. High-purity GaAs is also used for high-efficiency solar cells like those aboard NASA's Spirit and Opportunity rovers currently on Mars.

NRL discovered solar-wind hydrogen in Apollo lunar soil samples provided by a NASA-funded research mission.

Fundamental aspects of stealth technology were developed at NRL, including the radar absorption mechanisms in ferrite-containing materials. Metal bearing surface treatments using Cr ion implantation researched at NRL nearly tripled the service life of Navy turbine engine parts and was adopted for Army helicopter parts as well. Fluorinated polyurethane coatings developed at NRL are used to line fuel storage tanks throughout the US Navy, reducing leakage and environmental and fuel contamination. The same polymer films are used in Los Angeles-class submarine radomes to repel water and enable radar operation soon after surfacing.

Scientists at NRL frequently contribute theoretical and experimental research on novel materials, particularly magnetic materials and nanomaterials and thermoplastic.

=== Radar ===
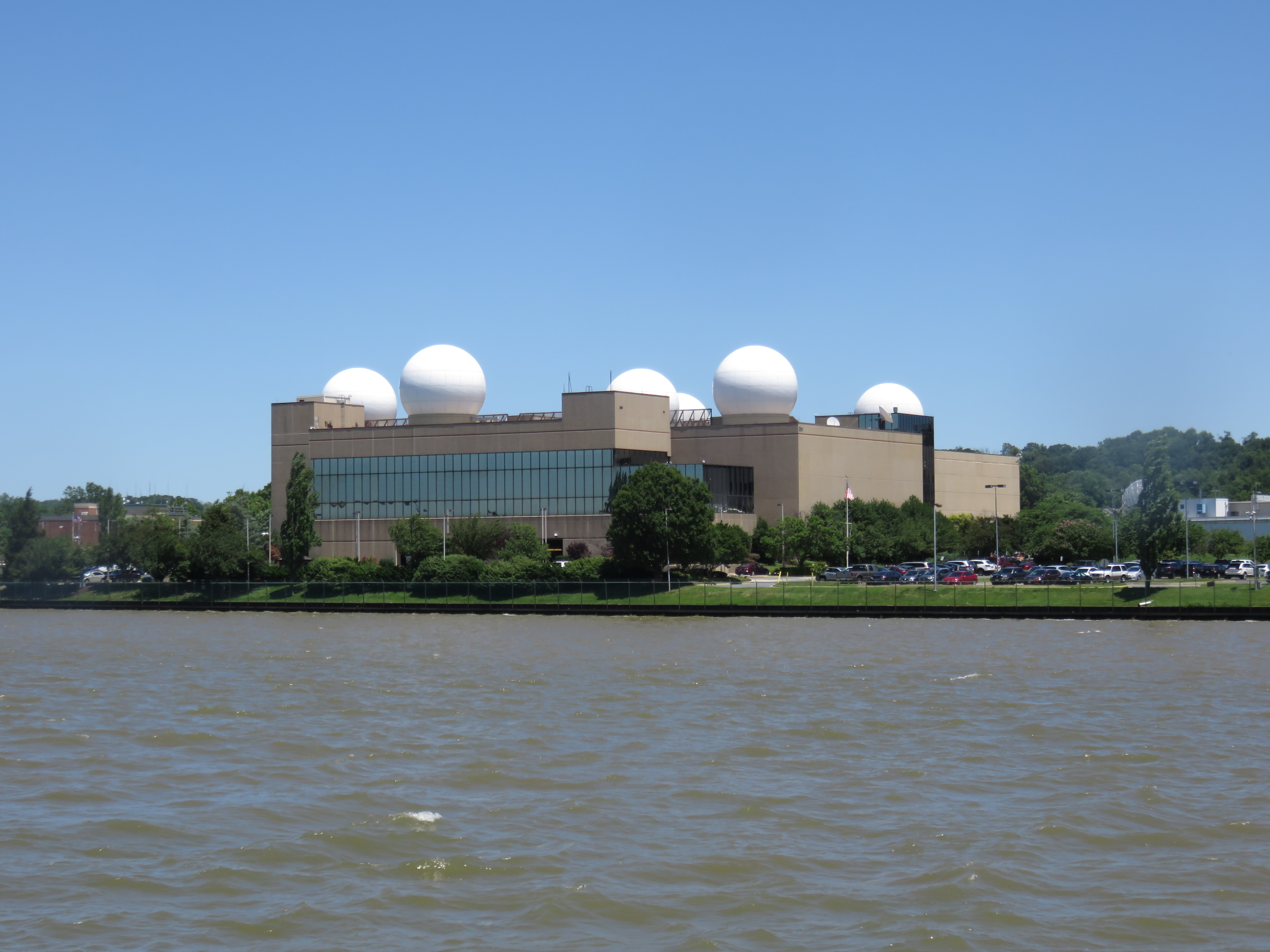
This building on NRL's main campus features prominent radomes on its roof

The first modern U.S. radar was invented and developed at NRL in Washington, DC in 1922. By 1939, NRL installed the first operational radar aboard the USS New York, in time for radar to contribute to naval victories of the Coral Sea, Midway and Guadalcanal. NRL then further developed over-the-horizon radar as well as radar data displays. NRL's Radar Division continues important research & development contributing to US Navy and US Department of Defense capabilities.

The technologies were then also applied to the antennas at the Long Wavelength Array, where the system utilizes the antenna to perform astronomical and ionospheric research. The DLITE system was also created and deployed thereafter, supporting the scientific community and advancing bistatic radar technologies.

=== Tactical electronic warfare ===
NRL's Tactical Electronic Warfare (TEW) Division is responsible for research and development in support of the Navy's tactical electronic warfare requirements and missions. These include electronic warfare support measures, electronic countermeasures, and supporting counter-countermeasures, as well as studies, analyses, and simulations for determining and improving the performance of Electronic Warfare systems. NRL TEW includes aerial, surface, and ground EW within its scope. NRL is responsible for the identification, friend or foe (IFF) system and a number of other advances.

=== Information security ===
The Information Technology Division features an information security R&D group, which is where the IETF's IP Security (IPsec) protocols were originally developed. The Encapsulating Security Payload (ESP) protocol developed at NRL is widely used for virtual private network (VPN) connections worldwide. The projects developed by the laboratory often become mainstream applications without public awareness of the developer; an example in computer science is onion routing, the core principle of the anonymizing Tor software.

=== Nuclear research ===
Nuclear power research was initiated at NRL as early as 1939, six years before the first atomic bomb, for the purpose of powering submarines. Uranium enrichment methods sponsored by NRL over the course of World War II were adopted by the Manhattan Project and guided the design of Oak Ridge National Laboratory's Uranium enrichment plant. NRL is currently developing laser focusing techniques aimed at inertial confinement fusion technology.

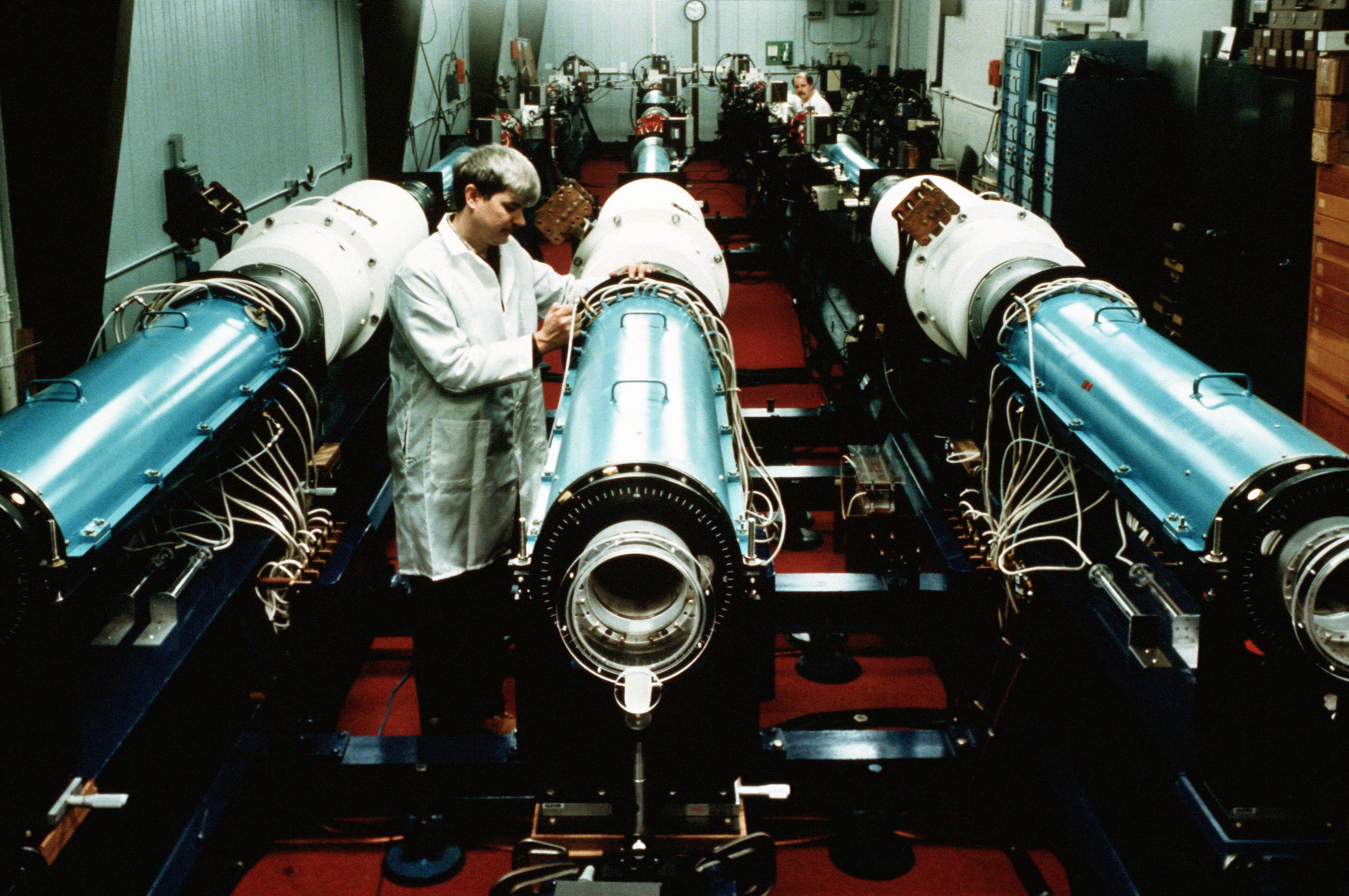
A technician at the NRL working on one of the three beam lines in the Pharos III laser facility.

=== Physical sciences ===
The static discharger seen on trailing edges of virtually all modern aircraft was originally developed by NRL scientists during World War II. After the war, the laboratory developed modern synthetic lubricants initially for use in the Navy's jet aircraft but subsequently adopted by the commercial jet industry.

In the late 1960s, NRL researched low-temperature physics, achieving for the first time a temperature within one millionth of a degree of absolute zero in 1967. In 1985 two scientists at the laboratory, Herbert A. Hauptman and Jerome Karle, won the Nobel Prize for devising direct methods employing X-ray diffraction analysis in the determination of crystal structures. Their methods form the basis for the computer packages used in pharmaceutical labs and research institutions worldwide for the analysis of more than 10,000 new substances each year.

NRL has most recently published research on quantum computing, quantum dots, plasma shockwaves, thermodynamics of liquids, modeling of oil spills and other topics.

NRL operates a small squadron of research aircraft termed Scientific Development Squadron (VXS) 1. Its missions include, for example, Rampant Lion, which used sophisticated airborne instrumentation (gravimeters, magnetometers and hyperspectral cameras) to collect precise 3D topography of two-thirds of Afghanistan and locate natural resources (underground gas and mineral deposits, vegetation types, etc.) there and in Iraq and Colombia.

=== Plasma science ===
The Division of Plasma Physics conducts research and development into ionized matter. NRL currently holds the world record for most energetic rail gun projectile (33 MJ, 9.2 kWh) and fastest man-made projectile (2.24 million mph, 3.60 million km/h).

=== Artificial intelligence ===
NRL established the Navy Center for Applied Research in Artificial Intelligence in 1981, which conducts basic and applied research in artificial intelligence, cognitive science, autonomy, and human-centered computing. Among its achievements are advances in cognitive architectures, human-robot interaction, and machine learning.

== Organization ==
As of 2026, the laboratory is divided into four research directorates, one business directorate, and one executive directorate. All the directorates are headquartered in Washington, D.C. Some directorates have other facilities elsewhere, primarily at the Stennis Space Center in Bay St Louis, Mississippi and in Monterey, California.

=== Staff ===
Most NRL staff are civilians in the civil service, with a relatively small number of Navy enlisted personnel or officers. Virtually all NRL staff are US citizens and are not dual-nationals. In addition, there are some support contractors that work on-site at NRL. As of 31 December 2015, across all NRL locations, NRL had 2540 civilian employees (i.e., not including civilian contractors). On the same date, there were 35 military officers on-board NRL and 58 enlisted on-board NRL, most of whom are with NRL's VXS-1 Scientific Flight Detachment, which is located at the Patuxent River ('Pax River') Naval Air Station (NAS) in southern Maryland.

NRL has special authority to use a Pay-Band pay system instead of using the traditional General Schedule (GS) pay system for its civilian employees. This gives NRL more ability to pay employees based on performance and merit, rather than time-in-grade or a seniority metric. There are several different pay-band groups at NRL, each being for different categories of civilian employees. As of 31 December 2015, NRL had 1615 civilian scientists/engineers in the NP pay system, 103 civilian technicians in the NR pay system, 383 civilian administrative specialists/professionals in the NO pay system, and 238 civilian administrative support staff in the NC pay system.

NRL scientists & engineers typically are in the (NP) pay group in NRL's Pay Band system. The NP-II pay band is equivalent to GS-5 Step 1 through GS-10 Step 10. The NP-III pay band is equivalent to GS-11 Step 1 through GS-13 Step 10. NRL's Pay Band IV corresponds to the GS-14 Step 1 to GS-15 Step 10 pay grades, inclusive, while NRL's Pay Band V can pay above GS-15 Step 10 and corresponds to the Senior Technologist (ST) pay grade elsewhere in the civil service.

For new graduates, someone with a Bachelor of Science degree typically is hired at a salary in the GS-7 range; someone with a Master of Science degree typically is hired at a salary in the GS-11 range; someone with a PhD typically is hired at a salary in the GS-12 range. NRL has the flexibility to offer partial student loan repayments for new hires.

According to the NRL Fact Book (2016), of NRL civilian full-time permanent employees, 870 had a doctorate, 417 had a master's, and 576 had a bachelor's as their highest degree.

The laboratory also hosts post-doctoral researchers and was voted #15 in the Best Places to Work PostDocs 2013 survey.

=== Research directorates ===
The four research directorates within NRL are:

- The Systems Directorate (Code 5000) is responsible for performing a range of activities from basic research through engineering development to expand the operational capabilities of the US Navy. There are four research divisions: Radar, Information Technology, Optical Sciences, and Tactical Electronic Warfare.
- The Materials Science and Component Technology Directorate (Code 6000) carries out a range of materials research with the aim of better understanding of the materials in order to develop improved and advanced materials for use by the US Navy. There are seven research divisions: Laboratory for the Structure of Matter, Chemistry, Material Science & Technology, Laboratory for Computational Physics and Fluid Dynamics, Plasma Physics, Electronics Science & Technology, and the Center for Biomolecular Science & Engineering.
- The Ocean and Atmospheric Science and Technology Directorate (Code 7000) performs research in the fields of acoustics, remote sensing, oceanography, marine geosciences, marine meteorology, and space science. There are six research divisions: Acoustics, Remote Sensing, Oceanography, Marine Geosciences, Marine Meteorology, and Space Science.
- The Naval Center for Space Technology (Code 8000) is a focal point and integrator for NRL technologies used in space systems. It provides system engineering and technical assistance for development and acquisition of space systems. There are two research departments: Space Systems Development and Spacecraft Engineering.

=== Support directorates ===
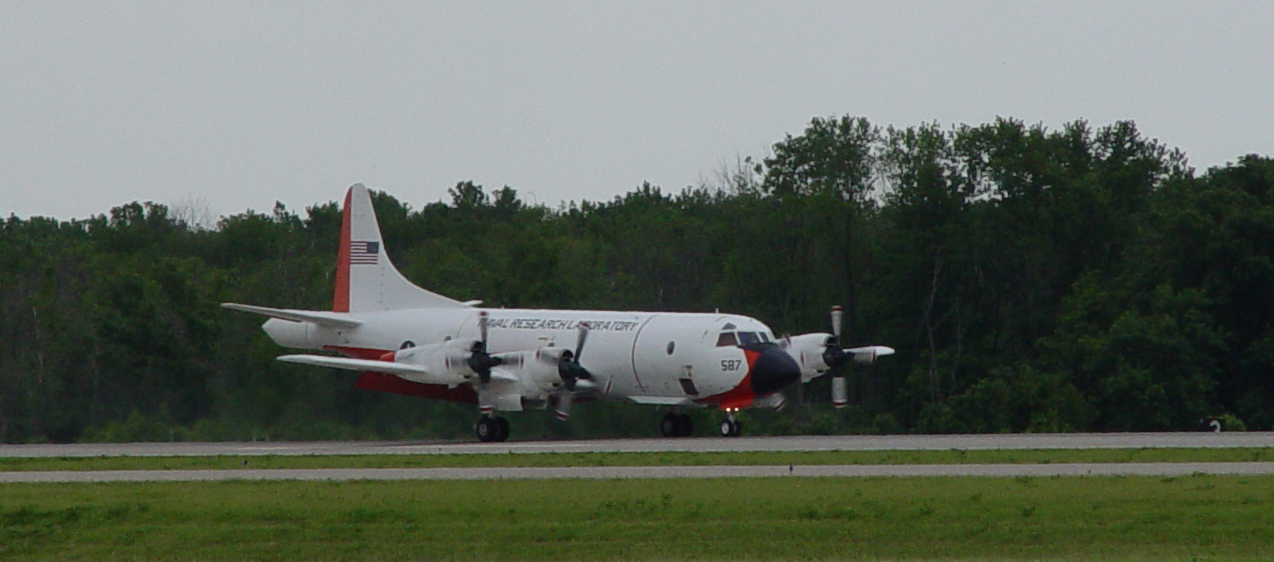
Scientific Development Squadron ONE (VXS-1) NP-3D Orion.

The two support directorates are:

- The Executive Directorate operations are directed by the Commander of the NRL, who typically is a US Navy Captain. Scientific Development Squadron ONE (VXS-1), located at Naval Air Station Patuxent River, Maryland, which provides airborne research facilities to NRL and other agencies of the US Government, is run out of the Executive Directorate.
- The Business Operations Directorate provides program management for the business programs which support the scientific directorates of NRL. It provides contracting, financial management and supply expertise to the scientific projects.

=== Nanoscience Institute ===
In April 2001, in a departure from traditional working relationships between NRL scientists, the Institute for Nanoscience was established to conduct multidisciplinary research in the fields of materials, electronics and biology. Scientists may be part of the Nanoscience Institute while still performing research for their respective divisions.

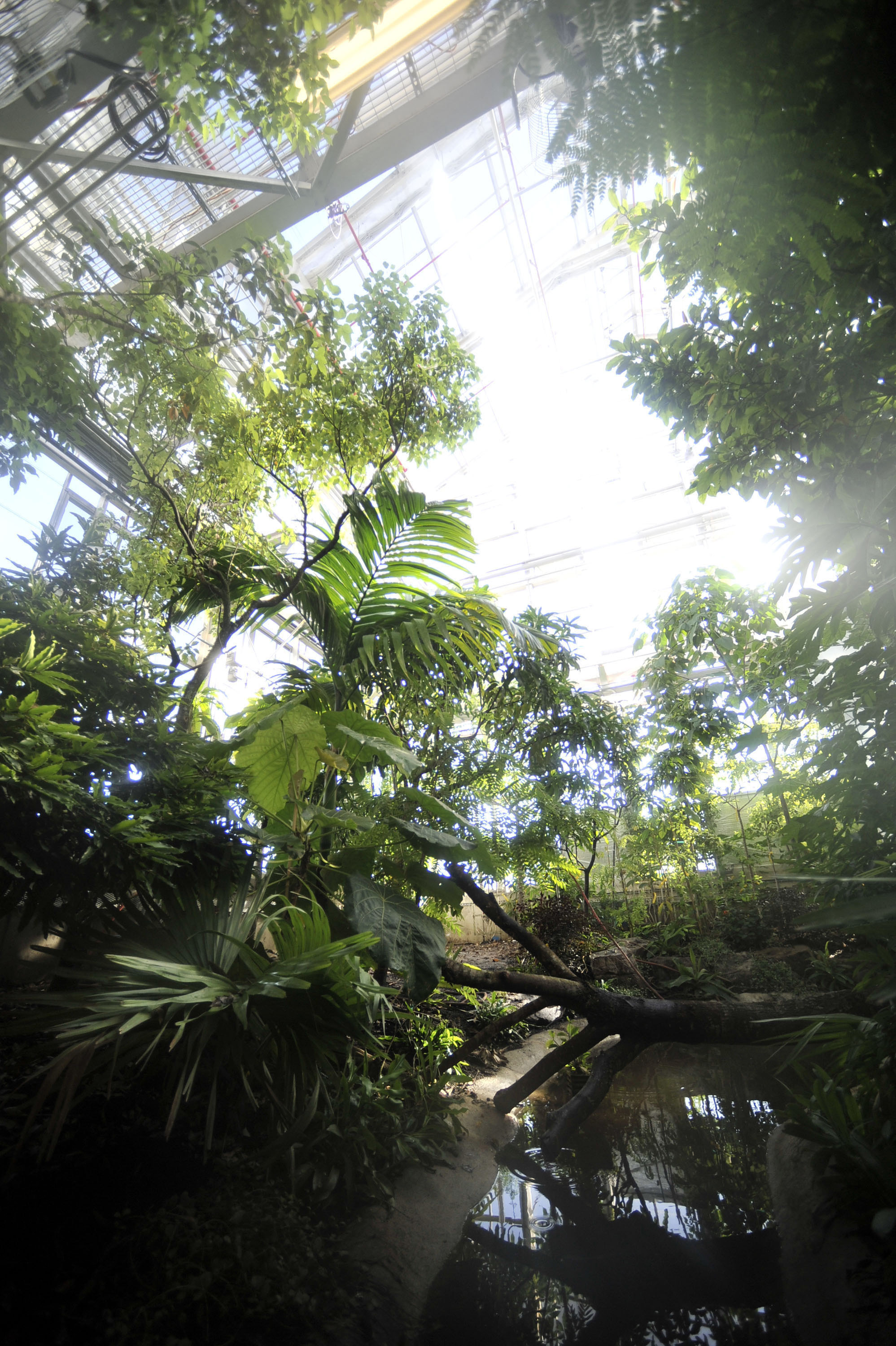
The Laboratory for Autonomous Systems Research has a Tropical High Bay that is a 60-foot by 40-foot greenhouse, and it contains a re-creation of a southeast Asian rain forest. In the Tropical High Bay, temperatures average 80 degrees with 80 percent humidity year round.

=== Laboratory for Autonomous Systems Research ===
Opened March 2012, the Laboratory for Autonomous Systems Research (LASR) is a 50,000 square foot facility that supports basic and applied research in autonomous systems. The facility supports a wide range of interdisciplinary basic and applied research in autonomous systems to include research in autonomous systems, intelligent autonomy, human-autonomous system interaction and collaboration, sensor systems, power and energy systems, networking and communications, and platforms.

LASR provides unique facilities and simulated environmental high bays (littoral, desert, tropical, and forest) and instrumented reconfigurable high bay spaces to support integration of science and technology components into research prototype systems.

== Locations ==
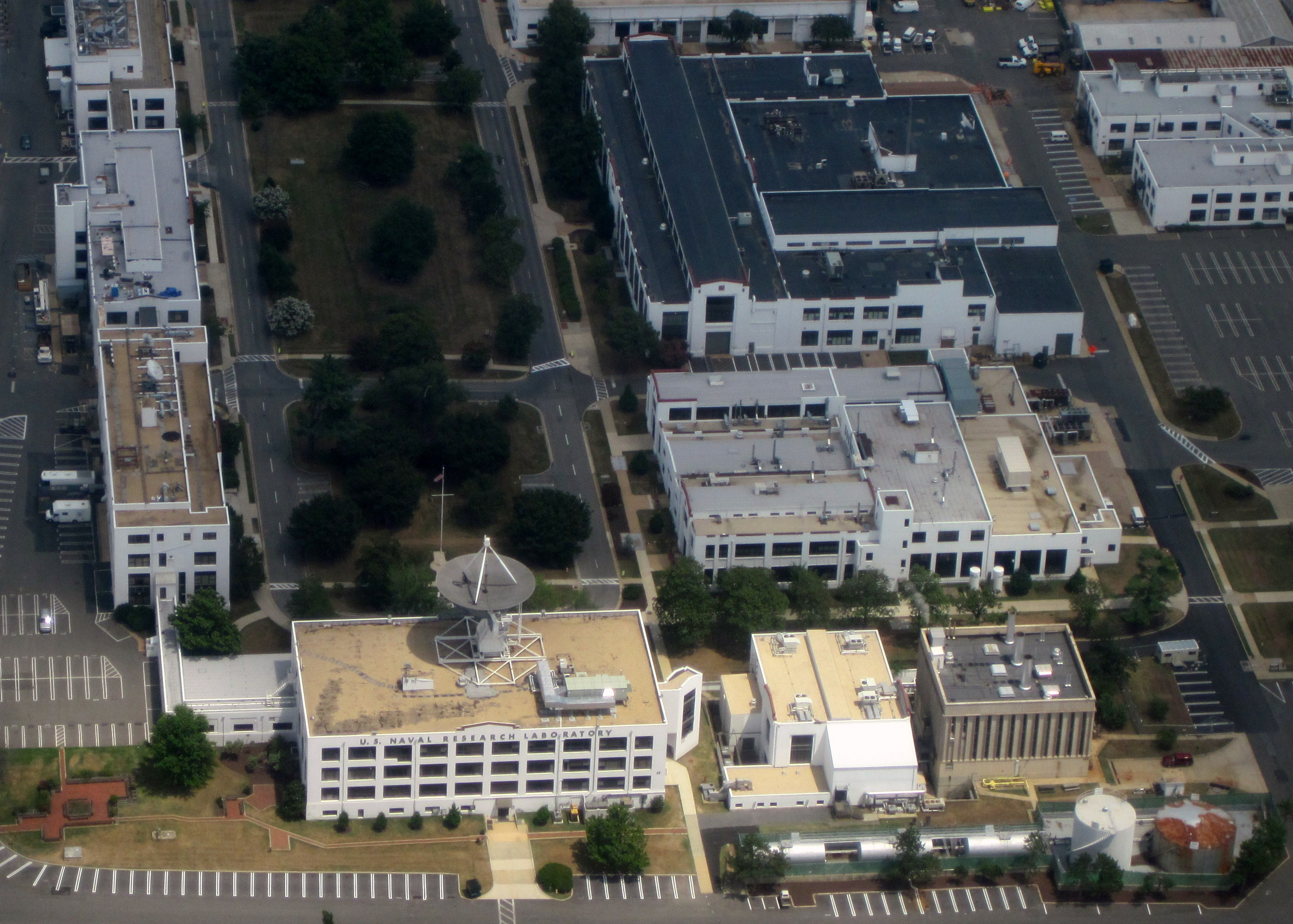
An aerial view of the NRL complex in 2012. The area shown contains the oldest five buildings on the campus.

The main campus of NRL is in Washington, D.C., near the southernmost part of the District. It is on the Potomac River and is immediately south of (but is not part of) Joint Base Anacostia-Bolling. This campus is immediately north of the Blue Plains site of the DC Water Authority. Exit 1 of northbound I-295 leads directly to Overlook Avenue and the NRL Main Gate. The U.S. Postal Service operates a post office on the NRL main campus.

In addition, NRL operates several field sites and satellite facilities:

- NRL-South is located at NASA's Stennis Space Center in Bay St. Louis, Mississippi, and specializes in oceanography, marine geology, geophysics, geoacoustics, and geotechnology.
- NRL-Monterey is located east of the Naval Postgraduate School in Monterey, California, sharing a campus with the Fleet Numerical Meteorology and Oceanography Center and the San Francisco Bay Area/Monterey local forecast office of the National Weather Service. NRL-Monterey is dedicated to meteorology and atmospheric research.
- The Scientific Development Squadron (VXS) 1 is located at the Patuxent River Naval Air Station in Lexington Park, Maryland, and operates a wide range of research aircraft.
- The Chesapeake Bay Detachment (CBD) in Chesapeake Beach, Maryland is 168-acre site for research in radar, electronic warfare, optical devices, materials, communications, and fire research. This facility is often used in combination with the Multiple Research Site on Tilghman Island, Maryland just across the Chesapeake Bay.
- The Midway Research Center in Quantico, Virginia, Free Space Antenna Range in Pomonkey, Maryland, and Blossom Point Satellite Tracking and Command Station in Blossom Point, Maryland are used by NRL's Naval Center for Space Technology.
- The Marine Corrosion Facility located on Fleming Key at Naval Air Station Key West in Florida is used by the Center for Corrosion Science & Engineering.
- NRL operates several synchrotron radiation beamlines and the Extreme-Ultraviolet and X-Ray Calibration Facility at the National Synchrotron Light Source at the Brookhaven National Laboratory.

== History ==
=== Early history ===
Artifacts found on the NRL campus, such as stone tools and ceramic shards, show that the site had been inhabited since the Late Archaic Period. Cecil Calvert, 2nd Baron Baltimore, granted the tract of land which includes the present NRL campus to William Middleton in 1663. It became part of the District of Columbia in 1791, and was purchased by Thomas Grafton Addison in 1795, who named the area Bellevue and built a mansion on the highlands to the east.

Zachariah Berry purchased the land in 1827, who rented it out for various purposes including a fishery at Blue Plains. The mansion was demolished during the Civil War to build Fort Greble. In 1873 the land was purchased by the federal government as the Bellevue Annex to the Naval Gun Factory, and several buildings were constructed including the Commandant's house, "Quarters A", which is still in use today.

=== Foundation ===
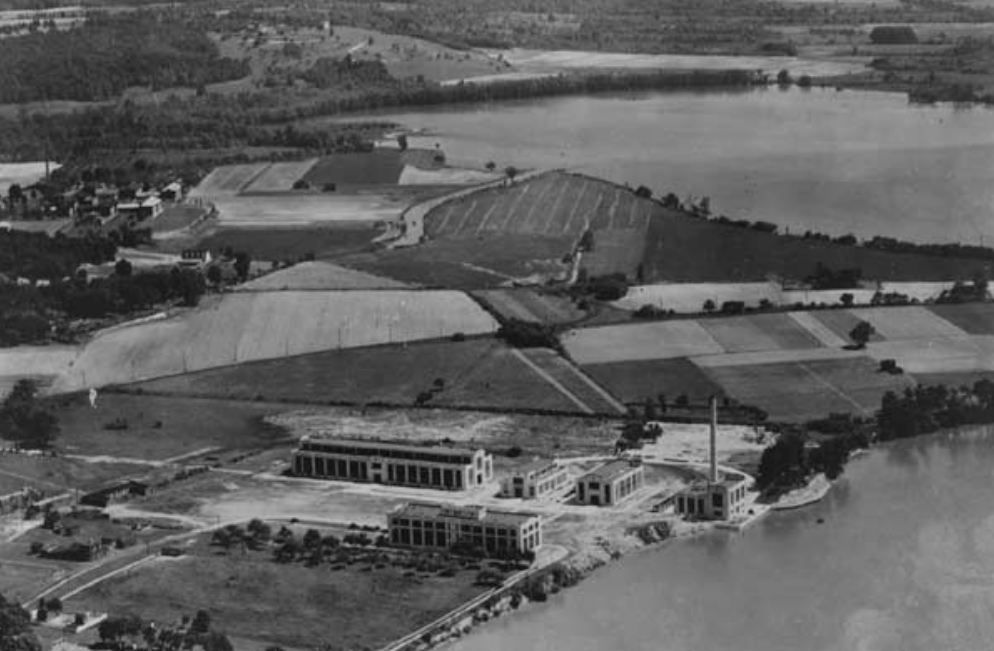
NRL in 1923, the year it was founded, showing the first five buildings on its campus

The Naval Research Laboratory came into existence from an idea that originated from Thomas Edison. In a May 1915 editorial piece in the New York Times Magazine, Edison wrote; "The Government should maintain a great research laboratory. ... In this could be developed ... all the technique of military and naval progression without any vast expense." This statement addressed concerns about World War I in the United States.

Edison then agreed to serve as the head of the Naval Consulting Board that consisted of civilians who had achieved expertise. The focus of the Naval Consulting Board was as advisor to the U.S. Navy pertaining to science and technology. The board brought forward a plan to create a modern facility for the Navy. In 1916 Congress allocated $1.5 million for implementation. However, construction was delayed until 1920 because of the war and internal disagreements within the board.

The U.S. Naval Research Laboratory, the first modern research institution created within the United States Navy, began operations at 1100 on 2 July 1923. The Laboratory's two original divisions – Radio and Sound – performed research in the fields of high-frequency radio and underwater sound propagation. They produced communications equipment, direction-finding devices, sonar sets, and the first practical radar equipment built in the United States. They performed basic research, participating in the discovery and early exploration of the ionosphere. The NRL gradually worked towards its goal of becoming a broadly based research facility. By the beginning of World War II, five new divisions had been added: Physical Optics, Chemistry, Metallurgy, Mechanics and Electricity, and Internal Communications.

=== World War II years and growth ===
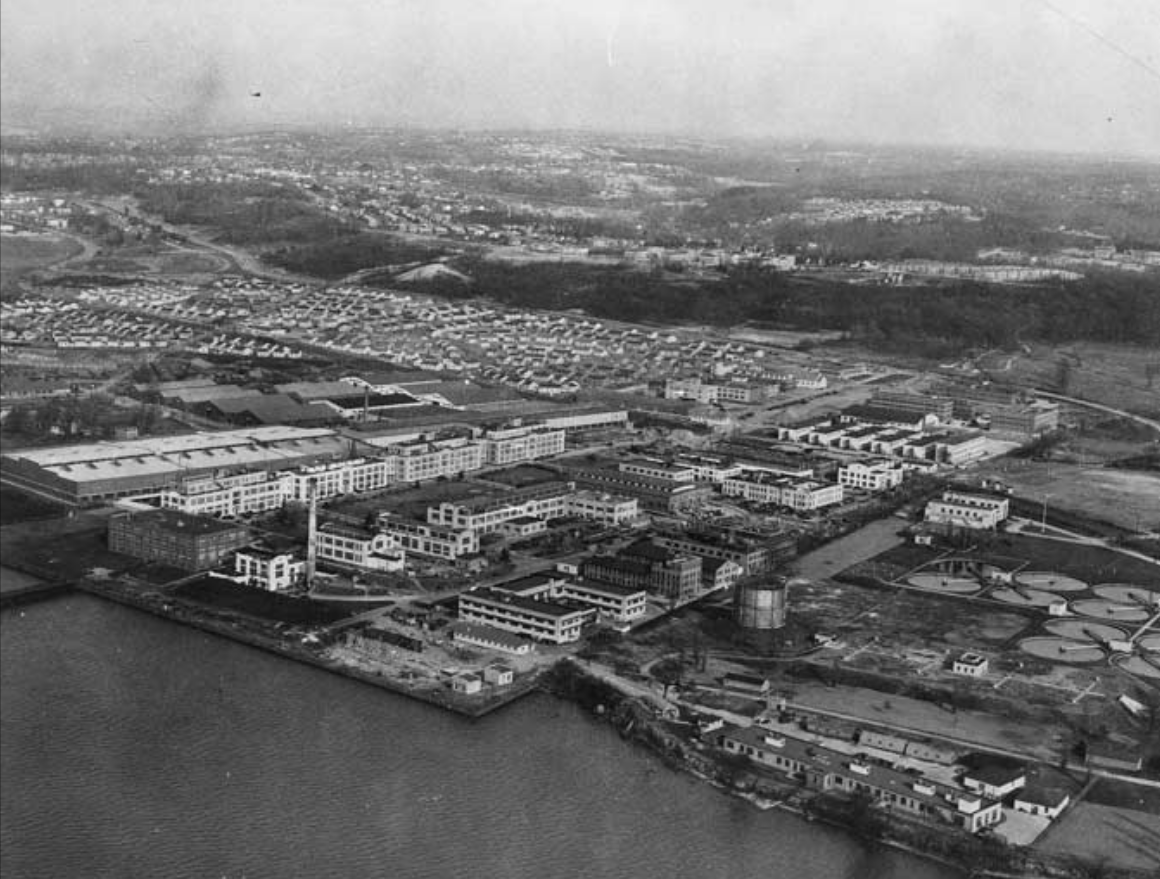
NRL in 1944, after significant wartime growth

Total employment at the NRL jumped from 396 in 1941 to 4400 in 1946, expenditures from $1.7 million to $13.7 million, the number of buildings from 23 to 67, and the number of projects from 200 to about 900. During World War II, scientific activities necessarily were concentrated almost entirely on applied research. Advances were made in radio, radar, and sonar. Countermeasures were devised. New lubricants were produced, as were antifouling paints, luminous identification tapes, and a marking dye to help locate survivors of disasters at sea. A thermal diffusion process was conceived and used to supply some of the U-235 isotope needed for one of the first atomic bombs. Also, many new devices that developed from booming wartime industry were type tested and then certified as reliable for the Fleet.

=== After WWII ===
As a result of the scientific accomplishments of the WWII, the United States emerged into the postwar era determined to consolidate its wartime gains in science and technology and to preserve the working relationship between its armed forces and the scientific community. While the Navy was establishing the Office of Naval Research (ONR) in 1946 as a liaison with and supporter of basic and applied scientific research, the Navy encouraged NRL to broaden its scope since it was the Navy Department's corporate research laboratory. NRL was placed under the administrative oversight of ONR after ONR was created. NRL's Commanding Officer reports to the Navy's Chief of Naval Research (CNR). The Chief of Naval Research leads the Office of Naval Research, which primarily is located in the Ballston area of Arlington, Virginia. The reorganization also caused a parallel shift of the Laboratory's emphasis to one of long-range basic and applied research in the full range of the physical sciences.

However, rapid expansion during the war had left NRL improperly structured to address long-term Navy requirements. One major task – neither easily nor rapidly accomplished – was that of reshaping and coordinating research. This was achieved by transforming a group of largely autonomous scientific divisions into a unified institution with a clear mission and a fully coordinated research program. The first attempt at reorganization vested power in an executive committee composed of all the division superintendents. This committee was impracticably large, so in 1949, a civilian director of research was named and given full authority over the program. Positions for associate directors were added in 1954.

=== Modern era ===
In 1992, the previously separate Naval Oceanographic and Atmospheric Research Laboratory (NOARL), with centers in Bay St. Louis, Mississippi, and Monterey, California, was merged into NRL. Since then, NRL is also the lead Navy center for research in Oceanographic and Atmospheric Sciences, with special strengths in physical oceanography, marine geosciences, ocean acoustics, marine meteorology, and remote oceanic and atmospheric sensing.

=== Centennial ===
Commissioned July 2, 1923, as the Naval Experimental and Research Laboratory—later shortened to the Naval Research Laboratory (c. 1926)—the laboratory began operations seven years after inventor Thomas Edison suggested that the Government establish "a great research laboratory."

Throughout the past century, NRL has changed the way the U.S. military fights, improved its capabilities, prevented technological surprise, transferred vital technology to industry, and tilted the world's balance of power on at least three occasions; with the first U.S. radar, world's first intelligence satellite, and first operational satellite of the Global Positioning System (GPS).

July 2, 2023, the U.S. Naval Research Laboratory celebrated 100 years of service as the Navy's corporate laboratory with a history of performing scientific research and making contributions to U.S. military forces.

== Environmental contamination ==
The Navy's environmental investigations began in 1984. NRL was not listed on the National Priorities List as a Superfund and the Maryland Department of the Environment has regulatory oversight. Since the early 2010s, the Navy and MDE have coordinated their activities at NRL's Chesapeake Bay Division (CBD) site, located in Chesapeake Beach, MD. In 2017 groundwater investigation PFAS were present at CBD in the shallow aquifer. As of 2022, there are 6 active IRP sites (Photo-processing Waste Discharge, fire testing area etc) and 3 active munition response sites at former small arms ranges with lead contamination in the Chesapeake Bay Detachment. An online Restoration Advisory Board (RAB) meeting in May 2021 alarmed residents because of extremely high PFAS levels in the soil at the CBD's fire training facility.

== See also ==
- United States Marine Corps Warfighting Laboratory (MCWL)
- Office of Naval Research (ONR)
- Air Force Research Laboratory (AFRL)
- United States Army Research, Development and Engineering Command (RDECOM)
- Defense Advanced Research Projects Agency (DARPA)
- Naval Research Laboratory Flyrt – Flying Radar Target
- History of radar
- Robert Morris Page – one of the main American radar scientists
- Interactive Scenario Builder – 3D modeling and simulation application for studying the radio frequency (RF) environment
- NRLMSISE-00 – model of the Earth's atmosphere from ground to space
- SIMDIS – 3D analysis and display toolset
- Clementine spacecraft
- National Research Libraries Alliance
- Fleet Electronic Warfare Center (FEWC)
- National Oceanic and Atmospheric Administration (NOAA)
- University-National Oceanographic Laboratory System (UNOLS)
- List of auxiliaries of the United States Navy
- TransApps – rapid development and fielding of secure mobile apps in the battlefield
