= Off Book =

US documentary web television program

- Genre: Web series
- Directed by: Eric Brown
- Country of origin: United States
- Original language: English

Production
- Production locations: New York City, United States

Off Book is a web series on digital culture and art created for PBS by Kornhaber Brown, a Webby award-winning production studio that creates web series, videos, and motion graphics. The series has been viewed more than six million times, and is the most shared documentary series ever online. It has been featured on prominent websites including Wired, The Huffington Post, The Atlantic, Fast Company, Gizmodo, Engadget, Mashable, and USA Today.
