= Empire Builder (disambiguation) =

The Empire Builder is a train route in the United States.

Empire Builder may also refer to:

- Empire Builder (board game)
- Empire Builder (album), by Laura Gibson
- SS Empire Builder, an Empire ship
- James J. Hill or the Empire Builder, Canadian-American railroad executive

== See also ==
- The Empire Builders, 1924 film
- Empire Builders (radio program), broadcast 1929-1931
- World Builder (disambiguation)
