= Quiet Electric Drive =

Quiet Electric Drive (QED)—sometimes called by the misnomer Quiet Electronic Drive—is an Office of Naval Research (ONR)-sponsored program to develop technologies for silent maritime propulsion for the United States Navy.

According to the ONR, QED's role is to "address the Navy's operational gaps in surface ship and submarine maneuverability and acoustic signature. Quiet Electric Drives, or QEDs, are quiet, efficient and power dense. The primary objective of QED is demonstrating the utility of the motor as an actuator to obtain signature reduction performance while increasing tactical speed and maneuverability".

Its existence is known particularly via a 2007 court case in which five ethnic Chinese suspects were convicted or pleaded guilty to smuggling data from a U.S. defense contractor. An FBI affidavit stated QED to be "an extremely sensitive project ... considered by the Navy to be significant military equipment and therefore banned for export to countries specifically denied by the U.S. State Department, including the PRC (China)". Chi Mak, a naturalized U.S. citizen born in China, and four other family members were arrested during their conspiratorial attempt to transfer QED and other U.S. military technologies to the PRC via espionage.

== See also ==
- Magnetohydrodynamic drive
