= With One Voice (film) =

- Directed by: Eric Temple
- Screenplay by: Carol and Matthew Flickstein
- Release date: 2009

With One Voice is a 2009 documentary directed by Eric Temple and written by Carol and Matthew Flickstein exploring the unity of humanity, featuring mystics from around the world, whose lives have been dedicated to answering the mysteries of existence.
