= List of video production companies =

This incomplete list covers the ever-expanding field of video production, and the companies which produce video products, whether for private or commercial purposes. It includes both well-known companies as well as smaller, local companies that have made notable contributions to the field of video production.

== Video production companies ==
- APV (Asia Pacific Vision)
- Seven Arts Pictures.
- MRB Productions
- Creative COW
- Arnait Video Productions
- HGV Video Productions
- Isuma
- Reeltime Pictures
- Canyon Productions
- Through a Glass Productions
- Tongal
- Sahelis Productions
- MAA Productions
- Filament Productions
- Ragtag Productions

== See also ==
- Video production
- List of video artists
- Category:Television production companies of the United States
- Category:Film production companies of the United States
- Category:Mass media companies of the United States
