= Tongal =

Content creation platform

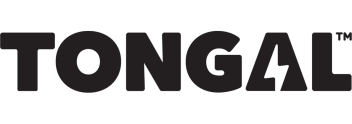
- Genre: Crowdsourcing
- Founded: 2009
- Founder: James DeJulio, Rob Salvatore, Mark Burrell
- Headquarters: Santa Monica, California, United States
- Area served: Worldwide
- Products: Film and other production projects
- Website: tongal.com

Tongal is an online content creation platform. Founded in New York City in 2009, Tongal is now based in Santa Monica, California. The platform connects businesses with writers, directors, and production companies to create content.

Tongal contributors earn money when their pitches are greenlit by clients. Tongal has contributed to TV commercials, original content, digital advertising, and instructional videos. Beyond projects for organizations such as Sundance, Tongal's other clients have included LEGO, Mattel, Procter & Gamble, Unilever, Johnson & Johnson and NASA.

== History ==
=== Founding and business model (2007–2009) ===
Tongal was founded by James DeJulio, Rob Salvatore, and Mark Burrell, who first began developing the business model after a conversation in June 2007. Initially formed in 2009 "in a New York hotel room," Tongal went live and launched its first video project, related to Comedy.com, on May 20, 2009. Tongal hired its first employee in October 2009, and two months later the community had 1,000 members.

As a crowdsourcing company for creative work, Tongal states that its mission is to "bring the world's creative work to the world's creative talent." The founders selected the name Tongal as an anagram of "Galton," referring to the social scientist Sir Francis Galton. He had been highlighted in James Surowiecki's book The Wisdom of Crowds, which posits that a diverse collection of people is likely to make certain decisions and predictions better than individuals or even experts. The opening anecdote relates Galton's surprise when a crowd at market tried to guess the weight of an ox, and their averaged guesses proved accurate. The story would inspire Tongal's ox logo.

=== Early growth (2010–2013) ===
The "pitch phase" of Tongal debuted on March 16, 2010, and marked the first "tournament style" project for the company. In September 2010, the company was named to the PepsiCo10 for being one of "the 10 most innovative start ups in social media." Among other projects, in August 2011 the Tongal video "Stuck on Duck Video Project" by David Brashear went viral, and for a time was the tenth most viewed video on Vimeo.

In early 2012, the company launched its 100th project and shortly after, in February 2012 Tongal began a long-term partnership with LEGO. The following month Tongal began working with Pringles and P&G, and in April 2012 Tongal relocated to Marina del Rey in Santa Monica, California. In December 2012, Tongal raised funds from Insight Venture Partners.

Tongal notably aired a Speed Stick commercial on February 3, 2013 during the Super Bowl. Titled "Unattended Laundry" and a part of Speed Stick's "Handle It Campaign," it was listed at No. 12 on a ranking of the top 2013 Super Bowl ads by The Kellogg School of Management. On May 4, 2013, Tongal opened a new headquarters in Santa Monica. In October 2013, a Tongal office was opened in the United Kingdom. A New York City office opened in January 2014.

=== Growth (2014–2015) ===
Tongal was listed 205th in the Inc 500 for 2014, which lists the fastest growing companies in the United States. It also won a Gold Medal at the 2014 Edison Awards for Collaboration and Knowledge Management. As of 2014, Tongal handled approximately 200 projects annually. From 2010 to 2015, Tongal's revenue had doubled five times.

Tongal first held the Tongies, an awards ceremony for Tongal community members, in April 2014. As of 2015, Tongal has a global community of more than 70,000 writers, directors and filmmakers in 140+ countries. In 2015, it had seven films in the Sundance Film Festival, and 41 of its 70,000 workers earned salaries of over six figures.

=== Recent (2020-present) ===
In 2020, Tongal collaborated with The Lego Group to release Lego World Builder, an online platform where users can share Lego-related ideas, story lines, and worlds.

== Platform and process ==
Tongal projects are open to anyone with a good idea and any filmmakers with the experience to execute it. Typically, each project is posted onto the website and broken up into three phases — "idea," "pitch" and "video," with all stages allowing contribution from anyone.

- Idea Phase: In this phase, a business or entity posts a project to Tongal, with a total amount of prize money to be awarded over several phrases. The community then generates ideas with short descriptions, leaving often thousand of ideas for the business to choose from. Finalists typically win a portion of the money, even if their idea is not the final selection.
- Pitch Phase: In the next phase, which is intended for community members with a degree of technical skill, directors and production companies pitch production aspects of the winning ideas, for example storyboards and scripts. As of 2015, Tongal states it receives about 50 pitches per project.
- Video Phase: After the business selects the production winner and awards money, shooting begins on several projects, with work also put into soundtracks and other aspects of production. From those finished videos, the business selects the winners and distributes the rest of the prize money, with some often relegated to runner-up videos and third-place videos.

== Notable projects ==
=== Ads and commercial work ===
Tongal's clients have included large companies such as Facebook, Volvo Cars LEGO, Mattel, Procter & Gamble, Unilever, Johnson & Johnson and NASA, with videos often developed for particular brands and subsidiaries.

External videos
- "Stuck On Duck Video Project" (August 2011)

An example of Tongal's crowdsourcing approach for ads can be seen with Duck Products' 2011 "Stuck On Duck Video Project", which featured Jay Maynard aka Tron Guy. The video, which advertises a brand of ducktape, was featured in Wired Magazine as a "genius idea," and doesn't use any special effects.

An early example of Tongal's work is a video under the demo section of Kiva's French website. Tongal was used to source the video, which serves to "explain the process and clarify what we're doing and what our mission is." In late 2012 Tongal did its first Spanish language project for Suavitel, and also by that time the company had worked with Pepsi on short video pieces about Brisk Tea, with Tongal facilitating a contest for the best film pitches.

Tongal has also done video for the Care Bears and Strawberry Shortcake franchises through American Greetings Properties. Lucasfilm and Pringles also jointly commissioned Tongal for a commercial, with a total of $75,000 in prize money distributed to seven finalists. In 2012 a Tongal ad for Speed Stick was featured during the live broadcast of the Super Bowl.

=== World Builder ===
A website started by Tongal and The Lego Group in 2020 where users can create pitches for future Lego properties.

=== Music videos and popular music ===
Bands such as The Who and Umphrey's McGee have had music video contests through Tongal, as well as Bob Marley's estate for a 2014 fan-made video of "One Love/People Get Ready."

External videos
- "One Love" by Bob Marley – Official Music Video (December 4, 2014)
- "California Feelin'" by The Beach Boys – Official Music Video (December 9, 2014)

To promote the 2011 Beach Boys box set The Smile Sessions, music video concepts for "Good Vibrations" and "Heroes and Villains" were submitted through Tongal, with the concepts then voted on and ultimately selected by other fans. A similar project was undertaken in 2013 for the Beach Boys box set Made in California, with fans contributing via Tongal to the production of a music video for the previously unreleased track "California Feelin'." Tongal users were also given a chance to submit a lead guitar track for "Going to the Beach," with the winner's performance mixed into the song by Mark Linett and Alan Boyd.

In April 2014, Gene Simmons launched a Tongal project to celebrate the 40th anniversary of Kiss. The project was part of a new Tongal service titled Left Field, which utilizes social media and short project descriptions.

=== Fiction film and documentaries ===
Tongal has also had several projects to create original content. Tongal teamed up with Sundance Institute and the Bill & Melinda Gates Foundation to create "unique, compelling, and personal short films exploring an empowering person or an optimistic story about individuals and communities who are overcoming poverty and hunger, combating disease, or improving health." The winners each received $10,000 and their films premiered at 2015 Sundance Film Festival.

Tongal has also partnered with Lionsgate, Women in Film (WIF), and the author of the Twilight books Stephenie Meyer to create short films set in the Twilight universe in 2014. Other projects involved Spitfire Pictures.

DirecTV announced it was partnering with Tongal on The Next Great American Documentary in 2015, a 60-minute film meant to air in 2015 on DirecTV’s Audience Network channel. The project started with a subject phase open to anyone 13 years or older in the United States, and has a $50,000 budget production budget.

== The Tongies ==
The Tongies
- Awarded for: 13 categories of production related to Tongal projects
- Country: United States
- Presented by: Tongies Nominating Committee
- First award: 2014–present
- Website: Tongies

A Tongie award is not to be confused with Tongie, a Shetland sea spirit

The Tongies is an annual awards ceremony put on by Tongal since 2014. The purpose of the Tongies is to recognize the Tongal community by awarding work done on Tongal during the previous calendar year. Work is nominated by the Tongies Nominating Committee, with the nominated material then posted online for the community to vote on. The various category winners are awarded a Tongie, a metal statuette fashioned as a head with a half-smile, half-frown and a lightning bolt on top.

The first Tongies awards ceremony was held April 2, 2014 at the El Rey Theatre in Los Angeles. Thirteen Tongies were awarded, with categories such as Best Comedy, Best Broadcast Spot, Best Animation and Video of The Year. Kiss frontman Gene Simmons and The Pointer Sisters performed, with Simmons awarding the Best Original Song category. The second annual Tongies was held March 5, 2015 at the Avalon Theater in Hollywood.

== Awards and nominations ==
Year	Award	Nominee	Category	Result
2014	Edison Awards	Tongal	Collaboration & Knowledge Management	Won

== See also ==
- Crowdsourcing creative work
- Social networking service
- List of crowdsourcing projects
- List of video production companies
- List of social networking websites
