= Lego World Builder =

Online platform ran by Lego and Tongal

World Builder
- Available in: English
- Owner: Tongal
- Website: worldbuilder.tongal.com
- Launched: August 2020; 6 years ago

Lego World Builder is an online platform hosted by Tongal in collaboration with The Lego Group where users can pitch their own ideas for Lego-related properties, known on the platform as worlds. The website was launched in 2020.
