= Interactive Scenario Builder =

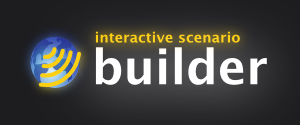
- Developer: Advanced Tactical Environmental Simulation Team
- Stable release: 4.10.0 / September 4, 2026
- Written in: Java
- Operating system: Cross-platform
- Available in: English
- Type: EM tactical decision aid
- License: GOTS
- Website: builder.nrl.navy.mil

Interactive Scenario Builder (Builder) is a modeling and simulation, three-dimensional application developed by the Advanced Tactical Environmental Simulation Team (ATEST) at the Naval Research Laboratory (NRL) that aids in understanding radio frequency (RF) and electro-optical/infrared (EO/IR) propagation. (Note: Darken, R.P.; Hill, T.A.; Solan, B.T.; Brookes, C.B. (1996). "A Hybrid Virtual Environment Interface to Electronic Warfare Information". Proceedings of the 1996 Modeling, Simulation, and Virtual Prototyping Conference. Archived from the original on 2021-02-26.)

== Uses ==
- RF and EO/IR tactical decision aid
- Creation/generation of complex electronic warfare (EW) synthetic environments (scenarios)
- Simulation of both hardware and/or modeling of existing and future EW systems
- Visualization of the RF capabilities of platforms
- Modeling the communication of radar systems by calculating one-way and two-way RF propagation loss
- Pre-mission planning
- Near-realtime, geospatial and temporal situational awareness
- After-action debriefing
- Acquisition
- Support to operations (Ops)
- Surface EW test and evaluation (T&E)
- Training
- Options development
- Targeting support

=== Operational use ===
- The Effectiveness of Navy Electronic Warfare Systems (ENEWS) group used Builder to support the design, specification, and evaluation of EA-6B and AN/SLY-2 (AIEWS) EW systems from the conceptual through the design stages.
- The Fleet Information Warfare Center (FIWC) used Builder to assist in EW asset scheduling and allocation during Operation Desert Fox and the Kosovo campaign.
- The U.S. Army's 160th Special Operations Aviation Regiment uses Builder for mission planning and mission rehearsal.

== Developer information ==
Builder is developed by the:

- Advanced Tactical Environmental Simulation Team (ATEST) (Code 5774)
- Electronic Warfare Modeling & Simulation (EW M&S) Branch (Code 5770)
- Tactical Electronic Warfare Division (TEWD) (Code 5700)
- Systems Directorate (Code 5000)
- Naval Research Laboratory (NRL)
- Office of Naval Research (ONR)

A listing in the Department of Defense (DoD) Modeling and Simulation Resource Registry (MSRR) states that "The primary objective of the Electronic Warfare Modeling and Simulation Branch is to develop and utilize tools for effectiveness evaluations of present, proposed, and future electronic warfare (EW) concepts, systems, and configurations for U.S. Naval Units." The EW M&S Branch used to be known as the Effectiveness of Navy Electronic Warfare Systems (ENEWS) Group (Code 5707) circa 2005. At that time, the Builder Team was under Code 5707.4. In an NRL "Solicitation, Offer and Award" document, the "Statement of Work" section states that "Code 5707 has historically developed simulations of naval EW systems, anti-ship threats, and military communication systems to support the development, fielding and testing of electronic and weapons systems."

== See also ==
- Office of Naval Research (ONR), a sponsor of Builder development
- Naval Research Laboratory (NRL)
- SIMDIS, another application developed by the EW M&S Branch

== General references ==
- Mathewson, B.A. (2021). Barrett, A. (ed.). "Emission Control and Aviation" (PDF). Aviation Digest. 9 (4). United States Army Aviation Branch: 33–35. Archived from the original (PDF) on 13 December 2021.
- Klena, L.; Skopowski, J. "Assessment of Tactical Ground Unit Technical Signature Management Procedures". Naval Postgraduate School. Archived from the original on 19 March 2021.
- Joint Electromagnetic Spectrum Operations (PDF). Chairman of the Joint Chiefs of Staff. 22 May 2020. p. H-4. Archived from the original (PDF) on 2021-02-08.
- Tune in to S. Strang from NRL's Advanced Tactical... 56th Annual AOC International Symposium & Convention. Washington, D.C.: US Naval Research Laboratory. 28 October 2019. Archived from the original on 2021-03-01.
- "NRL Highlights New Model Enhancements". Show Daily. National Training and Simulation Association. I/ITSEC. 1 December 2016. Archived from the original on 2021-02-27.
- The Importance of Dirt in Radio-Frequency Testing and Spectrum Management (PDF). 2015 ITEA DEPS Directed Energy Symposium. Las Vegas, NV: International Test and Evaluation Association. May 2015. Archived from the original (PDF) on 2021-03-14.
- Zothner, T. (2 April 2015). "Live CREW Training Now Available at Home Station with Boost from Electronic Warfare Software". www.army.mil. United States Army. Archived from the original on 2015-10-30.
- Pywell, M. (September 2013). Development and management of high-fidelity test technology for comprehensive performance evaluation of electronic warfare systems in multi-threat environments (PDF) (PhD thesis). University of Central Lancashire. p. 75. Archived from the original (PDF) on 2018-11-03.
- "Naval Research Laboratory Modeling and Simulation Job Opportunity". The NASA World Wind Forum. 19 October 2012. Archived from the original on 13 March 2021.
- Performing Electronic Attack in the U.S. & Canada for Tests, Training, and Exercises (PDF). Chairman of the Joint Chiefs of Staff. 20 March 2011. p. D-2. Archived from the original (PDF) on 2020-10-25.
- Burbank, J.L.; Kasch, W.; Ward, J. (2011). "RF Propagation Simulators". An introduction to network modeling and simulation for the practicing engineer. Hoboken, N.J.: John Wiley & Sons. ISBN 978-1-118-06364-4.
- "TEW ~ EW Modeling/Simulation: Advanced Tactical & Environmental Simulation Section". US Naval Research Laboratory. Archived from the original on 2010-02-14.
- Andrusenko, J.; Burbank, J.; Ward, J. (1 December 2009). "Modeling and Simulation for RF Propagation" (PDF). Applied Physics Laboratory. Archived from the original (PDF) on 2021-03-01.
- Ivanic, N.; Rivera, B.; Adamson, B. (October 2009). "Mobile Ad Hoc Network emulation environment". MILCOM 2009 - 2009 IEEE Military Communications Conference. IEEE. pp. 1–6. doi:10.1109/MILCOM.2009.5379781. ISBN 978-1-4244-5238-5. S2CID 14810551.
- EW M&S from Engineering to Campaign. AOC EW Modeling and Simulation Conference. Las Vegas, NV: US Naval Research Laboratory. 29 July 2009.
- Comparetto, G.; Marshall, J.; Mirhakkak, M.; Schult, N.; Schwartz, J.; Zhang, K.; DiOrio, D.; Thai, S. (November 2008). "Quantifying network performance of Mobile Ad-hoc Networks". MILCOM 2008 - 2008 IEEE Military Communications Conference. IEEE. pp. 1–7. doi:10.1109/MILCOM.2008.4753312. ISBN 978-1-4244-2676-8. S2CID 19209139.
- Clarke, T.L. (September 2008). "An Ontological Approach to Developing Information Operations Applications for Use on the Semantic Web" (PDF). Naval Postgraduate School. Archived (PDF) from the original on 2021-03-01.
- Defense Science and Technology Success Stories. DoD Research and Engineering. 2007. pp. 118–119.
- "Member News". Naval Engineers Journal. 110 (1–3). American Society of Naval Engineers: 10. 1998.
