= Canyon Productions =

American video production company

Canyon Productions was a video-production company founded in 1992 by filmmaker Eric Temple. Located in Bethesda, Maryland, Canyon Productions did documentary, corporate and government video production. In July 2011, Canyon Productions relocated to Ogden, Utah, where it now does business under the name of Highway 89 Media.

== Documentaries ==
Canyon Productions produced the award-winning PBS Documentary, Edward Abbey: A Voice in the Wilderness, which explored the life of American author and environmentalist Edward Abbey.

Canyon also produced two DVDs for the folk and Americana singer-songwriter, Tom Russell. Hearts on the Line was a concert documentary that chronicled Russell's rolling folk music festival aboard a train traveling across Canada. It was distributed by HighTone Records. Mano a Mano was a DVD recorded at the 2008 National Cowboy Poetry Gathering in Elko, Nevada, featuring Russell and Ian Tyson conducting a workshop for songwriters. A DVD retrospective of Russell's life and career, Don't Look Down, was released in September, 2011.

Canyon Productions collaborated with Matthew Flickstein to produce and direct an award-winning documentary, With One Voice. The film featured mystics from many of the great spiritual traditions around the world, whose lives have been dedicated to answering the mysteries of existence and finding common ground among people of all faiths.
