= Matthew Flickstein =

Matthew Flickstein is a teacher of insight (vipassana) meditation. He was formerly a psychotherapist, and at one time was ordained as a Buddhist monk in the Theravada tradition. Flickstein’s primary teacher has been the Venerable Bhante Henepola Gunaratana.

In 1982, Flickstein and Bhante Gunaratana co-founded the Bhavana Society Monastic and Meditation Center in West Virginia.

In 1993 he founded the Forest Way, a non-profit organization that provides a variety of retreat opportunities designed to nurture authentic spiritual growth. One of its guiding principles is to support a unified vision of spirituality in the world.

In 2007, Flickstein embarked on an ambitious path to produce a documentary film to promote spirituality and peace, entitled "With One Voice." The program interviews mystics and spiritual leaders from fifteen different traditions to attempt to discover the common truth among all faiths. It has been released worldwide on broadcast television and home video. In 2009, the film, co-produced by Canyon Productions, Inc., won two Bronze Telly Awards.

== Books ==
- Journey to the Center, Wisdom Publications 1998. ISBN 978-0-86171-141-3
- Swallowing the River Ganges, Wisdom Publications 2001. ISBN 978-0-86171-178-9
- The Meditator's Atlas, Wisdom Publications 2007. ISBN 978-0-86171-337-0
