= Old Friends ... New Friends =

American television documentary series

- Genre: Documentary
- Created by: Fred Rogers
- Directed by: Arthur Barron; Margy Whitmer; Joe Cosentino
- Theme music composer: Johnny Costa
- Country of origin: United States
- Original language: English
- No. of seasons: 2
- No. of episodes: 20

Production
- Producers: Arthur Barron; Margy Whitmer; Joe Cosentino
- Production locations: United States; Mexico
- Running time: 30 minutes
- Production company: Family Communications, Inc.

Original release
- Network: PBS
- Release: April 15, 1978 – September 25, 1980

Old Friends ... New Friends is an American television documentary series created and hosted by Fred Rogers during his hiatus from producing Mister Rogers' Neighborhood. Produced by Family Communications, Inc., it originally aired on PBS from April 15, 1978, to September 25, 1980.

An episode begins with Rogers walking into the WQED-TV production studio, greeting staff members, and then walking onto a living room set, where the main content of the episode begins. He would give introductory remarks, then the episode would segue to on-location interviews with the episode's guests conducted by Rogers. The interviews often take place at the guests' home or hometown. The episode would end with a transition to Rogers giving concluding remarks. This format varies in some episodes. Some feature Rogers giving a monologue about his own life. Some episodes focuses on subject matters and guests suggested by Rogers' viewers. The series also features items sent by Rogers' viewers, which include letters, family photos, and patches of fabric from their favorite old clothing.

Rogers said he created the series to address his observation that older generations were becoming increasingly isolated from younger generations. He said the series addresses the problem by having "each episode [being] based on the central philosophical assumption that older people are an integral and formative part of all our lives, an essential part of the human family." He said the series emphasizes the fact that "each one of us makes a difference in this world.", which he said was also emphasized in Mister Rogers' Neighborhood. He said the series addresses the problem by also focusing on a variety of guests: those who are young, old, unknown, or famous, and making viewers "understand enduring relationships and interactions between people of all generations."

Reception of the series was largely negative. Critics identified many problems, which includes Rogers' inability to let go of his childlike persona from Mister Rogers' Neighborhood, the series' failing to give viewers a comprehensive understanding of complex relationships between its guests, the series' lack of focus on dramatic moments, and Rogers' inability to coax his guests into revealing their feelings. A former colleague of Rogers said that Rogers was not as intimately connected with the series and experienced with running it as he was with Mister Rogers' Neighborhood. Some critics said the series has some exceptionally compelling episodes, which includes Rogers' ability to make one of his guests, Lee Strasberg, reveal his personal feelings, and the series' dramatic portrayal of William Wasson and two of his adopted orphans, which was described as having "an incredible sensitivity for the feelings of others."

== Background ==
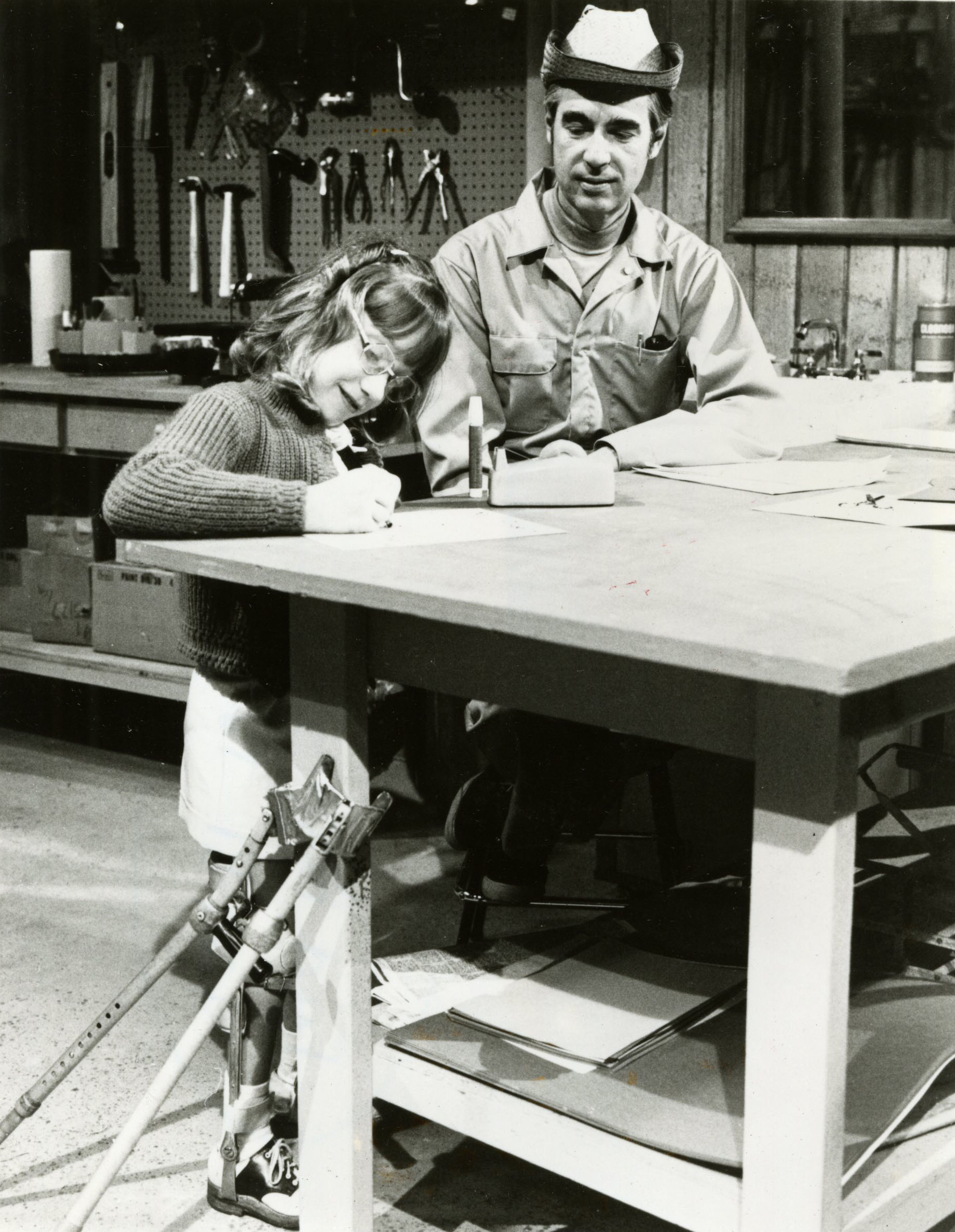
Rogers with Chrissy Thompson discussing physical handicaps on I Am, I Can, I Will, which premiered in 1981

In 1968, television producer Fred Rogers created and hosted a half-hour educational children's television series called Mister Rogers' Neighborhood, which used the concepts of early child development and emphasized young children's social and emotional needs. In 1975, after 455 color episodes (earlier ones were in black and white), Rogers stopped producing new episodes of Mister Rogers' Neighborhood. Basil Cox, then manager of Family Communications, Inc., the company that produced the program, said the choice was made completely by Rogers and surprised his colleagues. Rogers chose to allow the Neighborhood's 455 color episodes to air as reruns rather than producing new episodes, stating that he felt that he had covered the salient points in child development and that the program's regularly changing audience made further production unnecessary and a waste of funding.

During his hiatus from Mister Rogers' Neighborhood, Rogers continued to work on other television programs, including Old Friends ... New Friends, a documentary series, I Am, I Can, I Will, a program for children with disabilities, and Let's Talk About ..., a series that covers stressful moments in family life, such as reassuring children going into the hospital. Rogers said they all centered around his primary concern for the family: "There are so many forces in society that split the family ... The family is essential to the growth of human beings and television can be an integrative force in the family rather than a divisive one."

By 1979, the second and last season of Old Friends ... New Friends with 13 episodes began production. That same year, the production of a new season of Mister Rogers' Neighborhood, consisting of 15 episodes lasting three weeks, started.

=== Funding ===
By 1977, three episodes of the first season were filmed and were to be shown to sponsorship candidates that summer. The Richard King Mellon Foundation gave $250,000 for the first three episodes and agreed to provide a total funding of $1 million under what Rogers called "a kind of matching grant", with the remaining required funding having to be received from other donors. The foundation donated an additional $250,000 to fund the remaining four episodes of the first season. The foundation later granted the $1 million total. The show was also funded by the Corporation for Public Broadcasting. According to Maxwell King, a biographer of Rogers, the funding was insecure. This, along with low ratings, made the series' production unsustainable.

== Format ==
The format varies. The series includes "on-location documentary sequences, dramatized episodes and personal experiences submitted by members of the audience". Rogers asked viewers to send letters, "photographs of favorite people or places", patches of "fabric from a favorite old coat or blanket", old clothing, needlework, homemade objects, and poetry, which would become part of the set. The items were not returned to the senders. After the first three episodes were aired, Rogers said he would focus on subject matters and guests suggested by his viewers.

An episode starts with Rogers walking into the WQED-TV production studio. He greets various staff members by name and goes on a living room set, where he introduces the episode's guest(s).

Each episode has a runtime of about 30 minutes.

== Name ==
Rogers made friends with many people with different interests during his then 24-year career of producing children's television programs. Among them include Hoagy B. Carmichael (son of Hoagy Carmichael), Robert Frost, his barber Nick Failla, William Sloane Coffin, and filmmaker Betsy Nadas. Rogers said that being able to learn about their lives changed his own life. This inspired him to create an adult television program where he can portray their lives. By the time the production of Old Friends ... New Friends started, they became "old friends." During early production, the series was tentatively titled "Old Friends". Later in the production, Rogers met "new friends" who he also wanted viewers to learn from. This collection of "old friends" and "new friends" that were part of his program inspired Rogers to name the series as "Old Friends ... New Friends".

== Purpose ==
Rogers said that Old Friends ... New Friends was created to address the increasing isolation and division between younger and older generations, from his belief that the generations "have much to give each other", and that differences in age should not separate people. Clark Santee, who worked for Family Communications, Inc. during production of Old Friends ... New Friends agreed, stating that the young and elderly often face similar problems, including needing "reassurance that they have purpose".

Rogers states that in order to mend the age gap between the older and younger generations, "each episode will be based on the central philosophical assumption that older people are an integral and formative part of all our lives, an essential part of the human family." Rogers said Old Friends ... New Friends highlights the fact that "each one of us makes a difference in this world. That's the theme running through the whole series. But I think it runs through the Neighborhood series, too." He further explains: "Old Friends ... New Friends is a kind of television venture for me. And yet, the whole idea behind it is as old as Mister Rogers' Neighborhood. I believe that each person makes a difference in this world. And I also believe that television can be made personal enough so that people can be helped to believe that they do make a difference."

The series focuses on the life experiences of guests, both famous and unknown, to show viewers what people can learn from others. Rogers said "It will not be all famous persons ... What I'd like to show is the value of experience ..." The program highlights the influence that one person has on another, their family, or a community, and how each benefits from that influence. Rogers said "In Old Friends ... New Friends, we are going to present people who know who they are and can communicate their self-worth and their activities and accomplishments to others. Perhaps the most important matter in any person's life—at any age—is having a satisfying relationship with caring and trusted friends ... What I want to achieve is to enlarge our viewers' circle of friends by helping them to understand enduring relationships and interactions between people of all generations. The generations, young and old, have so much to give each other, to learn from each other." The guests' private philosophies and relationships are shown to guide viewers in their own life.

Rogers' concern for the elderly was fueled by his primary interest in the family. Rogers states "There are so many forces in society that split the family ... The family is essential to the growth of human beings and television can be an integrative force in the family rather than a divisive one." Rogers said the series was also inspired by letters he received from elderly viewers of Mister Rogers' Neighborhood, who explained that the show helped strengthen their relationships with their grandchildren. The program was also inspired by Rogers' concern that there was a lack of television programs for the elderly. Santee said "Fred began thinking about what direction he wanted to go [after Mister Rogers' Neighborhood] ... and he has been concerned about the lack of programming for the elderly." The show was also inspired by the friends that Rogers made during his career in producing children's programming. He was able to learn from his friends, who had a variety of interests. He said "So I often wished for a kind of television program in which I could offer adults the kind of friends who have come to mean so much to me." Those friends became guests of the series, which include Hoagy Carmichael's son Hoagy B. Carmichael, Robert Frost's barber Nick Failla, William Sloane Coffin, and Betsy Nadas.

The show is mainly targeted towards the elderly. Rogers explains: "With the Neighborhood, we hoped that the older children and parents would look over the small children's shoulders to watch the show ... Now [Old Friends ... New Friends] is geared for older people, and we hope the parents and young children will watch over the grandparents' shoulders." Rogers said "It's what I like to call an intergenerational program ... I would hope grandparents could watch it with their grandchildren." Despite the program's emphasis on older people, Rogers states that it is intended for people of all ages: "When I began it, some said 'Oh, you're doing a show for old people,' I said, 'Not at all. This is for all ages.' That's why in the first show we begin with a father [Hoagy Carmichael] and son [Hoagy B.], and what it means to grow up as the son of a famous father."

King said that Rogers' dedication to the viewer was intrinsically pastoral. Rogers shared the hope with a friend in a 1978 letter that church groups would watch Old Friends ... New Friends and have discussions based on the program.

== Production ==
The series was created and hosted by Rogers. Family Communications, Inc. acted as the production company. Arthur Barron, Margy Whitmer, and Joe Cosentino worked as director-producers. Johnny Costa worked as a musical director.

Some segments were filmed in the WQED-TV studio. Many were filmed on location with 16 mm stock. Rogers said "I've never traveled so much in my life ... Yesterday I was in New York talking with Robert Frost's sister. Tomorrow, at her suggestion, I'm off to the poet's farm in Derry, N.H. ..." The program was filmed in various parts of the United States, including California, Iowa, New York, and New Hampshire, and Mexico.

The series originally aired from April 15, 1978 to September 25, 1980 on PBS. Reruns aired until 1981.

=== Pilot episode ===
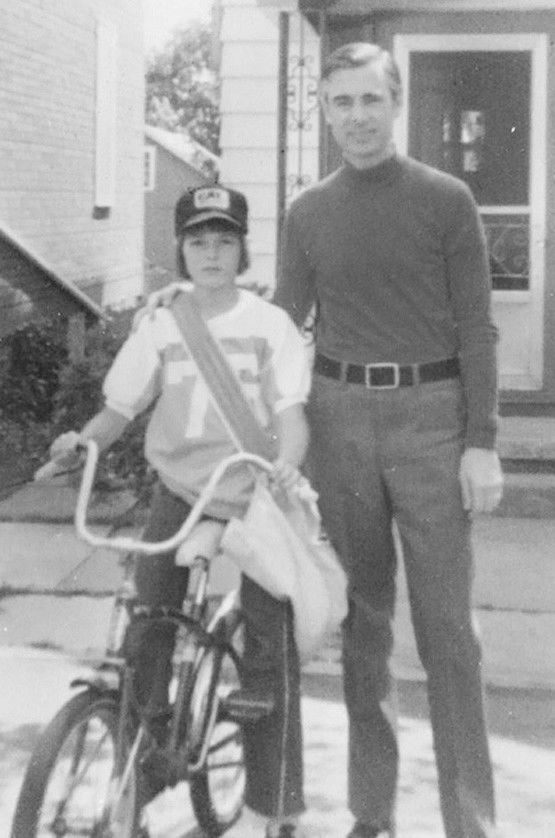
Rogers with a Ligonier newsboy in front of Rogers' fictional home during the filming of the pilot episode in 1976. The episode was planned to feature the boy delivering papers to Rogers' home. Rogers would then pick up the papers and wave to him. The boy ultimately did not appear in the series.

In May 1976, the pilot episode was filmed in the Pennsylvanian borough of Ligonier. Ligonier was chosen because it was near Pittsburgh, had a "charming atmosphere", and had "close cooperation with the residents and the [Ligonier Valley] Chamber of Commerce." Family Communications, Inc. worked with the Chamber of Commerce to schedule filming sites, which included select stores. Santee said the series was planned to be based in Ligonier. He explained: "We'd like to have a series based in a village. Ligonier provides us with a comfortable, familiar setting. It wouldn't be identified, but Ligonier is where most of it would be shot." The pilot portrayed Rogers as the resident of a home in Ligonier.

During the shooting of the pilot film, Rogers talked with children who gathered to watch the filming each day. Rogers paid a surprise visit at a local library to meet children.

The series was planned to be aired nationally in 1977 (a year earlier than its eventual premier date of 1978) had the pilot been successful. The episode was reviewed by the Andrus Geriantological Center in California. By the time the pilot was under the review, Rogers hoped that the series would start airing in early 1978, rather than 1977.

== Reception ==
King said that Rogers was unable to escape his childlike persona that he established while developing Mister Rogers' Neighborhood to make Old Friends ... New Friends have a presentation that adapts to its adult audience. King uses an episode from the first season, "Memories", to demonstrate this problem. The episode begins with Rogers showing letters and pictures that were sent by his correspondents. He then shows a home movie from one of his viewers. He then shows his own family photos, transitioning from the memories of his viewers to those of his own childhood. He talks about his childhood and his grandfather Fred McFeely. He shows a photo of his grandfather's house and then a video of himself as an adult standing next to a demolished house. He explains that the house was demolished after the death of his grandfather, and only his memories are left. The episode shows Buttermilk Falls, which was next to his grandfather's house. He explained that he would frequently play outside with his grandfather. The episodes transitions to a "contrived reenactment" of a childhood moment when his mother and grandmother tried to stop him from climbing a stone wall. His grandfather intervenes and lets him climb. King said that the episode was too "awkward and self-conscious" for an adult audience. He noted that the pacing and simplistic presentation of the series did not work for adults. He said that the presentation of the series "falls somewhere between children's television and the sort of earnest programming that might appear in an educational film made for a high school audience." King commented that "[t]he gentle, almost childlike style of Mister Rogers may have been fine when Fred was producing television for young children, but it comes across as somewhat hokey, almost, for an adult audience." He explained that without the entertainment value of his music and puppets from Mister Rogers' Neighborhood, Rogers was unable to take advantage of his strength in conversational television.

The series was unable to give viewers a complete understanding of complex relationships between guests. The first episode of the series, "Hoagy", exemplified this problem. In the episode, Rogers interviewed the famed singer-songwriter Hoagy Carmichael and his son Hoagy B, a world-class fishing-rod maker. The episode shows the son's difficulty with adjusting to his own life due to having a famous person as a parent. The program shows a constant underlying antagonism between the father and the son. Hoagy B. described the relationship: "My father's life is like a corridor with doors in it. You're behind one of them and the end of the corridor is his music. Every now and then he opens my door and does something with me. But you know the main event is at the end of the corridor. That's a truth that doesn't always feel good." Arthur Unger of The Christian Science Monitor noted that the episode was ultimately unsuccessful in giving viewers a full understanding of the relationship: "Perhaps it is demanding too much to hope that a half-hour show will delve deeply into complex human relationships—and come up with complete understanding. And, perhaps, in close relationships the love-hate syndrome is too intertwined to spread it all out on the table and clearly label each portion." Win Fanning of the Pittsburgh Post-Gazette said the episode "almost fully realized" its goal of exploring generation gaps, but "a bit more time would have been useful." John J. O'Connor of The New York Times said the episode "fell victim to awkward organization." Although the central idea of the episode was moving, he said "the treatment was curiously dispersed, leaving Mr. Rogers conclude on an inadequate note of understanding for all: 'It's not easy to be the son of a famous father. And it's not easy be the famous father either.'"

The series lacks a full understanding of the audience's interests. An episode from the second season, "Politics and the Family", shows an example of this problem. The episode starts with Senator John Heinz, his wife Teresa, and their son André discussing a recent accident in which André was hit in the head with a motor propeller and had a near-death experience. Teresa was direct and honest in the program. However, this powerful discussion gets prematurely cut off. The episode then shows Heinz campaigning. Heinz, in contrast to Teresa, was guarded. While Heinz was telling campaign supporters a story about his great-grandfather building churches, the episodes cuts to Teresa giving an honest description about political life: "Campaigning is a special kind of tension and pressure ... It's awful, in the sense of what it does to one's family life." The episode then prematurely moves back to John's guarded explanation about his political life. The episode then returns to the discussion about André's accident. At that point, the episode was almost finished. King noted that Rogers was unable to focus on the moments that viewers would find most interesting, such as André's near-death experience and Teresa's explanation about political life. King said "[Rogers] can't seem to focus in a way that delivers compelling documentary, conversational television for grown-ups. Mister Rogers' Neighborhood is marvelously thoughtful and thematic, always responding in perfect harmony with the children it serves. But Old Friends ... New Friends is the opposite: It seems to have little awareness of what its adult audience may be interested in ..."

The program was mostly unsuccessful in tapping into the guests' feelings. Morgan Neville, director of Won't You Be My Neighbor?, a documentary film about Rogers, explained: "... children speak exactly what they think, and they will tell you what they're feeling and they'll ask the questions they really want to know, ... And as you grow up, you build defenses and you mask your intentions and you hide your emotions. And Fred seemed to not tolerate that. Fred just wanted to be as honest and direct as possible. And adults have a hard time dealing with somebody who is that direct and that honest and that openly emotional vulnerable in that way."

Elizabeth Seamans, a former colleague of Rogers, said that Rogers was not as strongly connected with Old Friends ... New Friends as he was with Mister Rogers' Neighborhood. She said "[Old Friends ... New Friends] didn't come from inside of Fred the way other stuff did, and I don't think it ever had a chance. I'm not sure Fred really knew why he was doing [it]. The way the subjects came up was kind of pell-mell. They didn't come out of his marrow the way Mister Rogers' Neighborhood did, over time." She said Rogers' weak connection to Old Friends ... New Friends may be attributed to the lack of experience and time he needed to develop the series: "I think it's too bad [it] didn't have time to evolve. Fred's children's show had a long gestation period, all through the 50s. Television today doesn't often give you that time or opportunity."

Despite the series' many shortcomings, it has some exceptionally compelling moments. King stated that Rogers' interview with Lee Strasberg is known as Rogers' best work in his four-year career in producing adult television programs. Cox said "Lee Strasberg ... there's a guy who's you know, defended with five inches of bulletproof armor ... [Rogers] got through to him; and he got him to talk about things that were really personal. He had a—he had a gift, just an extraordinary gift, to get to people." O'Connor said the second episode of the first season, "Padre", was significantly better than its previous episode, "Hoagy". "Padre" focuses on Father William Wasson, a priest who emigrated to Mexico and later established an orphanage there. The episode focuses on two of its orphans: Antonio, a 12-year-old boy who recently arrived, and Filomen Torres, a 20-year-old man who lived in the orphanage since he was a child. O'Connor said the episode successfully portrayed the family and the two orphans' lives. He praised the film for "wast[ing] no time the obvious. It plunges into the middle of things." He said throughout the episode, "there is an incredible sensitivity for the feelings of others."

=== Awards and nominations ===
Award/nomination	Episode	Ref.
Red Ribbon, American Film Festival	"Actor's Actor"	
Blue Ribbon, American Film Festival	"The Healing Power of Love"	
First Place National Documentary, Odyssey Award	"The Healing Power of Love"	
Emmy Award nomination	"Inner Rhythms"	
Honorable mention, American Film Festival	"Psychologist and Risk Taker"	

== Episodes ==
The series has two seasons and 20 episodes in total. The first season has seven episodes and the second one has 13.

=== Season 1 ===
No.	Original title	Catalog title	Description	Guest(s)	Original air date
101	"Hoagy"	"Songmaker"	Rogers enters the WQED-TV studio. He talks with series musical director Johnny Costa and other staff members and thanks the audience for inviting him into their homes. He then plays some chords on a piano that he learned from Hoagy Carmichael, a famed musician. The episode transitions to a bar in Carmichael's hometown of Palm Springs, California. In the bar, Carmichael plays some of his compositions. After a short discussion between Rogers and Carmichael, Carmichael's son Hoagy B, a world-class fishing-rod maker, enters. The program segues to a collage of videos of Hoagy's career and the Carmichaels' home movies. The father and son exchange memories. They show affection for each other, but some memories were painful, especially for the son. The episode moves to Hoagy B.'s home in New York, where Rogers interviews the son. Hoagy B. explains that he feels neglected by his father, which he attributes to his father's focus on his musical career. Hoagy B. gives Rogers a fishing lesson at a stream by his house. At the conclusion of the episode, Rogers says "We've seen it is not easy to be the son of a famous father ... and that it's not easy to be a famous father, either."	Hoagy, Hoagy B. Carmichael	April 15, 1978
102	"Padre"		The episode portrays Father William Wasson, an American priest who emigrated to Mexico and later started an orphanage there. Rogers visits the orphanage. The episode focuses on two orphans: 12-year-old boy Antonio who recently joined the orphanage, and 20-year-old man Filomen Torres, who started residing in the orphanage since he was a child. Wasson states his main goals, which include making the orphans happy, unconditional acceptance, an emphasis on sharing over personal security, regular work schedules, and making the orphans take on responsible roles. The two orphans explain the emotional pain they experience from being abandoned, crying while doing so. The film shows Antonio visiting his aunt, who was too poor to care for him. The aunt cries upon meeting him. The episode shows Wasson celebrating a mass, with Mexican folk music playing, during which Rogers and the orphans embrace each other. Rogers closes the episode by saying "Each one of us has the capacity for sadness and joy, hatred and love—all existing together in our personalities. Father Wasson and his adult helpers and the children are trying to nurture their capacities for love where they find them. There's great dignity in that. Each one of them makes a difference in this world."	Father William Wasson, Antonio, Filomen Torres	April 22, 1978
103	"Helen Hayes and Millie"	"First Lady of American Theater"	Helen Hayes, actress and the first lady of the American Theater, talks to Rogers about things that are more meaningful to her than acting. Rogers goes to Nantucket Island to meet Millie Jewett, a 70-year-old Coast Guard Warrant Officer. She demonstrates her work with the Nantucket Island Coast Guard.	Helen Hayes	April 29, 1978
103	"Helen Hayes and Millie"	"Madaket Millie"	Helen Hayes, actress and the first lady of the American Theater, talks to Rogers about things that are more meaningful to her than acting. Rogers goes to Nantucket Island to meet Millie Jewett, a 70-year-old Coast Guard Warrant Officer. She demonstrates her work with the Nantucket Island Coast Guard.	Millie Jewett	April 29, 1978
104	"Uncle Miltie and the Whiz"		Rogers visits two comedians at their homes: the older Milton Berle ("Uncle Miltie") and the young newcomer Joe Restivo ("The Whiz"). They explain how they make their audience laugh, and the disagreeable aspects of comedy as a business. Rogers learns that "it takes an awful lot of work—often painful work—to be a comedian".	Milton Berle, Joe Restivo	May 6, 1978
105	"Memories" or "Welcome"	"Memories"	Rogers enters the living room set, sits down, and then sorts through his mail. He shows some letters and pictures sent by his correspondents. He then shows a home movie of one of his viewers. The episode then shows his barber Nick Failla, an Italian dancer, with his Italian dancing and singing group. He then shows his own childhood family photos. The photos show his younger self, his father, mother, and grandfather. He discusses his childhood and says he loved his grandfather for "encourag[ing] him to be [him]self." He shows a photo of his grandfather's house. He then shows a video of himself as an adult, standing by its ruins. He says the house was demolished after his grandfather died, and only his memories are left. The episode then shows Buttermilk Falls, a waterfall near his grandfather's house. He says he would frequently play with his grandfather outside during his childhood. He explains that his grandfather taught him to explore and improved his self-esteem. The film transitions to a reenactment of one of Rogers' childhood moments. The young Rogers was prevented by his mother and grandmother from climbing a stone wall, who wanted him to be safe. Rogers' grandfather intervenes and lets him climb the wall, saying that he needs to know how to be independent. Rogers says he was grateful of his grandfather for his intervention. Rogers emphasizes the importance of memories by saying "Our memories are ours to share or not to share. We have the right to make that decision." Betsy Nadas, a filmmaker, then shows children's games and lullabies to Rogers, some of them hundreds of years old.	Nick Failla, Betsy Nadas	May 13, 1978
106	"Melody"	"A Poet's Daughter"	The two-part episode describes "the relationships between generations." Rogers interviews Leslie Frost Ballantine, the eldest daughter of poet Robert Frost and a poet herself. Rogers also interviews blues singer John Jackson, who talks about learning to sing during his early life.	Leslie Frost Ballantine	May 20, 1978
106	"Melody"	"Blues Singer"	The two-part episode describes "the relationships between generations." Rogers interviews Leslie Frost Ballantine, the eldest daughter of poet Robert Frost and a poet herself. Rogers also interviews blues singer John Jackson, who talks about learning to sing during his early life.	John Jackson	May 20, 1978
107	"Commencements"		Rogers "explores beginnings and endings" by visiting Kenneth Koch, a poet who teaches children and the elderly, and Reverend William Sloane Coffin Jr., the pastor of Riverside Church in New York City and an activist.	Kenneth Koch, Reverend William Sloane Coffin Jr.	May 27, 1978

=== Season 2 ===
No.	Original title	Catalog title	Description	Guest(s)	Original air date
201	"Lee Strasberg"	"Actor's Actor"	Rogers visits the acting classes of "master-teacher" Lee Strasberg. Rogers also interviews his daughter Susan, who is a former student of Strasberg. He also interviews Shelley Winters.	Lee Strasberg	July 11, 1980
202	"Willie Stargell"	"Baseball Superstar"	Rogers visits the home of baseball player Willie Stargell. Stargell talks about his struggle balancing between his professional life and his personal life. He mentions that he rarely has time to spend with his family, saying "I spent just 10 days at home this winter and that bothers me ..."	Willie Stargell	July 18, 1980
203	"Nancy Acosta"	"Barrio Teacher"	Rogers visits 21-year-old teacher Nancy Costa in the barrios in La Puente, located near Los Angeles. She runs a school for dropouts, some of whom were expelled from school, have criminal records, or are illiterate. Despite this, she still shows love and respect for her students.	Nancy Acosta	July 25, 1980
204	"The Carradines"	"A Hollywood Family"	Rogers visits actor John Carradine and his four sons David, Christopher, Keith, and Robert. They talk about the struggles in their personal and professional lives. They also discuss about "satisfaction and disappointment, and the family's pursuit of elusive happiness."	John Carradine and Sons (David, Christopher, Keith, and Robert)	August 1, 1980
205	"Gerald Jampolsky"	"The Healing Power of Love"	Rogers goes to the Center for Attudinal Healing and meets Dr. Gerald Jampolsky. Jampolsky is a physician and the head and founder of the center. The doctor introduces Rogers to some of his patients, who are children with catastrophic illnesses. Dr. Jampolsky demonstrates the importance of loving support in treating those children.	Dr. Gerald Jampolsky	August 8, 1980
206	"Edgar Tolson"	"Appalachian Woodcarver"	Rogers visits sculptor Edgar Tolson. Tolson shows the Biblical sculptures he made. While looking at one of the Adam-and-Eve works made by Tolson, Rogers notes that Tolson and his sculptures are intertwined, saying "In some mysterious way it's like Tolson's figures are carving him,". "The more he creates them the more he becomes them." Rogers visits Michael Hall at the Cranbrook Academy of Art near Detroit. He also interviews Tolson's wife Holda.	Edgar Tolson	August 15, 1980
207	"Ruth Ellen Patton Totten"	"The General's Daughter"	The program explores "[t]wo women of distinction, wit and wisdom, widely different in background and experience but with a common interest in human nature...". Ruth Ellen Patton Totten is a daughter of General George S. Patton III, sister of George S. Patton IV, and wife of General James W. Totten. Rogers meets Mrs. Totten at her country home near Boston. She talks about "war, life, death and after life, and ... her father..." as well as how the military affected her life. Her parents expected her to become a lady, which her father defines as "[a] woman who acts like a gentleman." She talk about her father's views on war, saying that "[h]e loved the game of war," but she emphasizes that "[h]e didn't love the fact of war." The program shows archival clips of her father during war and peacetime. The program's second guest is Helen Ross, who was a high school teacher, leader of a girls' camp, and studied psychoanalysis with Sigmund Freud's daughter Anna. Ross taught specialists who worked with children and was a "pioneer in the psychoanalytic movement." She was also a personal friend of Rogers for several years. She died by the time the program was aired. The program shows clips from a taped interview with Rogers in 1975. She talks about "her own childhood and how children grow, the importance of family, the development of character and the fundamental value of love" as well as "her work with children." Roger says "[She] was one of those people who really knew how to listen..." "And when she did speak, you always felt she was telling you fundamental truths." Although the two women were quite different, Rogers notes one thing that they share in common: "The basic nurturant will that is one of the prizes of being a woman."	Ruth Ellen Patton	August 22, 1980
207	"Helen Ross"	"Pioneer Psychoanalyst"		Helen Ross	August 22, 1980
208	"Henry John Heinz III"	"Politics and the Family"	Senator John Heinz, his wife Teresa, and their son André talk about a near-death accident in which a motor propeller hit André's head. The program then shows clips of John campaigning. Teresa then explains how John's political life influenced "family, friendships, relationships and values." Later John talks about political life. The episode then returns to the discussion about André's accident. At the end of the program, Rogers elaborates on the phrase "the gravity of love", which André used to describe what saved him from the accident: "The gravity of love – so strong it can keep a child from drowning and keep a family together. André won't ever forget that his father was there when he needed him. John Heinz won't either. Love is what keeps us together and afloat."	Senator John Heinz	August 29, 1980
209	"Orville Harrison"	"Prison Counselor"	A two-part program, it "explores the struggles of two very different individuals to understand and master their feelings." Rogers meets artist, musician, counselor, and ex-convict Orville Harrison, and discusses his work. Rogers joins him in a counseling session for prisoners. Harrison's memory of a Thanksgiving in jail motivates him to help inmates get out of jail and reintegrate into society. Rogers meets five-year-old Chris Chirdon. Chirdon had trouble with understanding friendship and "reveals his inner self through his paintings and playtime habits." Both guests talk about "the common struggle of sorting out the 'good guy' from the 'bad guy' in each of us."	Orville Harrison	September 5, 1980
209	"Chris Chirdon"	"First Grader"		Chris Chirdon	September 5, 1980
210	"Michelle Knight and Kim Lemon"	"Two Young Gymnasts"	Rogers meets 13-year-old gymnasts Michelle Knight and Kim Lemon, "who have chosen this difficult road to excellence." They live with "discipline and competitive tension as fierce as that faced by athletes of any age." Rogers attends a Class 1 gymnastics competition.	Michelle Knight, Kim Lemon	September 12, 1980
211	"Lorin Hollander"	"Inner Rhythms"	Rogers interviews pianist Lorin Hollander. Hollander "explores his world of music, sounds, and feelings." Hollander performs for gifted children and prisoners, and he talks about his concern for them.	Lorin Hollander	September 19, 1980
212	"The Interviewers" (Note: Episodes 212 and 213 aired together as an hour-long special and final episode of the series. Episode 213 played in the first half-hour and episode 212 played in the last half-hour.)	"Psychologist and Risk Taker"	Boston psychologist Tom Cottle talks about "himself and his work, and the dynamics of human relationships." He discusses the importance of risk and vulnerability in relationships: "You cannot possibly go into an encounter with another human being without 1) saying 'I'm going to take a risk;' and without 2) saying 'I'm going to lay myself open.' There's going to be vulnerability. Without risk and vulnerability you call it a business lunch."	Tom Cottle	September 25, 1980
213	"The Interviewers"	"The Interviewers"	Rogers interviews talk show hosts Tom Snyder, Hugh Downs, and Susan Stamberg. Snyder is host of NBC's Tomorrow Show, Downs is anchor of ABC's 20/20, and Stamberg is co-host of NPR's All Things Considered. The program gives a "glimpse into [their] widely varied personalities ... and the insights they have into their profession."	Tom Snyder, Hugh Downs, Susan Stamberg	September 25, 1980

== Works cited ==
- King, Maxwell (2018). The Good Neighbor: The Life and Work of Fred Rogers. Abrams Press. ISBN 978-1-68335-349-2.
- Family Communications Order Forms and Catalogs (PDF). Family Communications, Inc. 1983. Archived from the original (PDF) on August 23, 2020.
