= Won't You Be My Neighbor? (film) =

2018 documentary film directed by Morgan Neville

- Theatrical release poster
- Directed by: Morgan Neville
- Produced by: Morgan Neville; Caryn Capotosto; Nicholas Ma
- Starring: Fred Rogers; François Clemmons; Yo-Yo Ma; Joe Negri; David Newell; Tom Junod; Joanne Rogers
- Cinematography: Graham Willoughby
- Edited by: Jeff Malmberg; Aaron Wickenden
- Music by: Jonathan Kirkscey
- Production companies: Tremolo Productions; Impact Partners; Independent Lens
- Distributed by: Focus Features
- Release dates: January 19, 2018 (Sundance); June 8, 2018 (United States)
- Running time: 93 minutes
- Country: United States
- Language: English
- Box office: $22.8 million

Won't You Be My Neighbor? is a 2018 American documentary film about the life and guiding philosophy of Fred Rogers, the host and creator of Mister Rogers' Neighborhood, directed by Morgan Neville. The trailer for the film debuted on what would have been Rogers' 90th birthday, March 20, 2018.

The film premiered at the 2018 Sundance Film Festival and was released in the United States on June 8, 2018. It received acclaim from critics and audiences and grossed over $22 million, becoming the top-grossing biographical documentary ever produced and the 12th largest-grossing documentary ever produced.

It was nominated for numerous awards, won the Independent Spirit Award for Best Documentary Feature, and was chosen by Time magazine as one of its top ten films of 2018.

== Premise ==
Filmmaker Morgan Neville examines the life and legacy of Fred Rogers, the beloved host of the popular children's television program Mister Rogers' Neighborhood.

== Production ==
One of the film's producers was Nicholas Ma, son of the famed cellist Yo-Yo Ma. As a child, the younger Ma appeared twice as himself in Mister Rogers' Neighborhood.

== Appearances ==
- Joanne Rogers (Fred's widow)
- John Rogers (Fred's son)
- Jim Rogers (Fred's son)
- Elaine Rogers Crozier (Fred's sister)
- Margy Whitmer (Fred's producer from 1979 onward)
- Hedda Sharapan
- François Scarborough Clemmons
- Tom Junod
- Yo-Yo Ma
- Joe Negri
- David Newell (Mr. McFeely)
- Howard and Pam Erlanger (parents of Jeff Erlanger)
- Jeff Erlanger in archival recordings
- Fred Rogers in archival recordings
- Koko in archival recordings
- Hilary Hahn

== Release ==
Won't You Be My Neighbor? was shown at many film festivals including on January 19, 2018, at the Sundance Film Festival, February 24, 2018, at the Boulder International Film Festival, March 2, 2018, at the True/False Film Festival, March 16, 2018, at the Miami Film Festival, and May 5, 2018, at the Montclair Film Festival. It had a limited release in US theaters on June 8, 2018. PBS aired the film on February 9, 2019, as part of the network's Independent Lens series.

In November 2018, director Morgan Neville revealed that the original title of the film was The Radical Mister Rogers, but after the election of Donald Trump, the term "radical" had a negative connotation according to Neville.

== Reception ==
=== Box office ===
Won't You Be My Neighbor? made $475,419 from 29 theaters in its first weekend, and $1 million from 96 theaters in its second. Expanding to 348 theaters the following week, it grossed $1.9 million, finishing tenth at the box office. It was added to an additional 306 theaters in its fourth weekend (for a total of 654) and made $2.5 million, again finishing 10th. It made $2.6 million the following weekend, becoming the highest-grossing documentary of 2018 in the process with $12.4 million.

On July 27, the film became the highest-grossing biographical documentary of all-time, and on August 12 passed Bowling for Columbine to become the 12th-highest-grossing documentary overall.

=== Critical response ===
On Rotten Tomatoes, the film holds an approval rating of 97% based on 255 reviews, and an average rating of 8.7/10. The website's critical consensus reads, "Won't You Be My Neighbor? takes a fittingly patient and honest look at the life and legacy of a television pioneer whose work has enriched generations." On Metacritic, the film has a weighted average score of 85 out of 100, based on 41 critics, indicating "universal acclaim".

Leslie Felperin of The Guardian gave the film a score of 4 stars out of 5, writing that the film "revel's that [Rogers] really was just what he seemed to be at first innocent sight: a kind-hearted, square but saintly man who genuinely loved and understood children." Amy Nicholson of Variety wrote: "Neville's fantastic archival footage reveals the man through his work—or at least, it reveals his philosophies, if not the childhood memories that gave Rogers the ability to understand a four-year-old's brain, almost as if he still carried his in his cardigan pocket."

David Edelstein of New York magazine wrote: "the most important thing we’re meant to take away is that no matter how we look or feel (sad, mad, plaid), we’re special, each of us, loved unconditionally by this nice, nice man." He concluded: "Won’t You Be My Neighbor? is a wonderful breather from reality, from which you come back more conscious of — and dismayed by — the hate that more than ever runs the world."

Peter Travers of the Rolling Stone wrote, "funny, touching...and timeless."

J. R. Jones, writing for the Chicago Reader, was more critical of the film in his review, saying: "Nobody wants to hate on Mr. Rogers, so Neville quickly brushes aside the conservative criticism that Mister Rogers' Neighborhood...may have helped foster our modern American culture of self-involvement and hypersensitivity. This gentle, positive treatment of Rogers coincides with the show's values but devalues his enormous social importance."

In December 2018, former US President Barack Obama listed the film as one of his favorite films of 2018.

In September 2019, A Beautiful Day in the Neighborhood director Marielle Heller described Won't You Be My Neighbor? as being closer a biopic about Fred Rogers than her film, which she claimed was more limited in how it covered the life of Rogers and focused mainly on his "philosophy and practice."

=== Accolades ===
Award	Date of ceremony	Category	Recipient(s)	Result	Ref.
Dorian Awards	January 12, 2019	Documentary of the Year	Won't You Be My Neighbor?	Won	
Golden Trailer Awards	May 31, 2018	Best Documentary	Won't You Be My Neighbor?	Won	
Critics' Choice Documentary Awards	November 11, 2018	Best Director	Morgan Neville	Won	
Critics' Choice Documentary Awards	November 11, 2018	Best Documentary	Won't You Be My Neighbor?	Won	
Critics' Choice Documentary Awards	November 11, 2018	Best Editing	Jeff Malmberg and Aaron Wickenden	Won	
Critics' Choice Documentary Awards	November 11, 2018	Most Innovative Documentary	Won't You Be My Neighbor?	Nominated	
Hollywood Music in Media Awards	November 14, 2018	Original Score—Documentary	Jonathan Kirkscey	Nominated	
Gotham Awards	November 26, 2018	Audience Award	Won't You Be My Neighbor?	Won	
Gotham Awards	November 26, 2018	Best Documentary	Won't You Be My Neighbor?	Nominated	
IDA Documentary Awards	December 8, 2018	Best Feature	Won't You Be My Neighbor?	Nominated	
National Board of Review	January 8, 2019	Top 5 Documentaries	Won't You Be My Neighbor?	Won	
Cinema Eye Honors	January 10, 2019	Audience Choice Prize	Won't You Be My Neighbor?	Nominated	
Cinema Eye Honors	January 10, 2019	Outstanding Achievement in Editing	Jeff Malmberg and Aaron Wickenden	Nominated	
Cinema Eye Honors	January 10, 2019	Outstanding Achievement in Graphic Design or Animation	Ariel Costa and Rodrigo Miguel Rangel	Nominated	
Cinema Eye Honors	January 10, 2019	Outstanding Achievement in Nonfiction Feature Filmmaking	Won't You Be My Neighbor?	Nominated	
Producers Guild of America Awards	January 19, 2019	Outstanding Producer of Documentary Theatrical Motion Pictures	Morgan Neville, Nicholas Ma, and Caryn Capotosto	Won	
Directors Guild of America Awards	February 2, 2019	Outstanding Directorial Achievement in Documentaries	Morgan Neville	Nominated	
Satellite Awards	February 17, 2019	Best Documentary Film	Won't You Be My Neighbor?	Nominated	
Independent Spirit Awards	February 23, 2019	Best Documentary Feature	Morgan Neville, Caryn Capotosto and Nicholas Ma	Won	

== See also ==
- A Beautiful Day in the Neighborhood, a 2019 biopic about Fred Rogers starring Tom Hanks
