= Fred Rogers's 1969 United States Senate testimony =

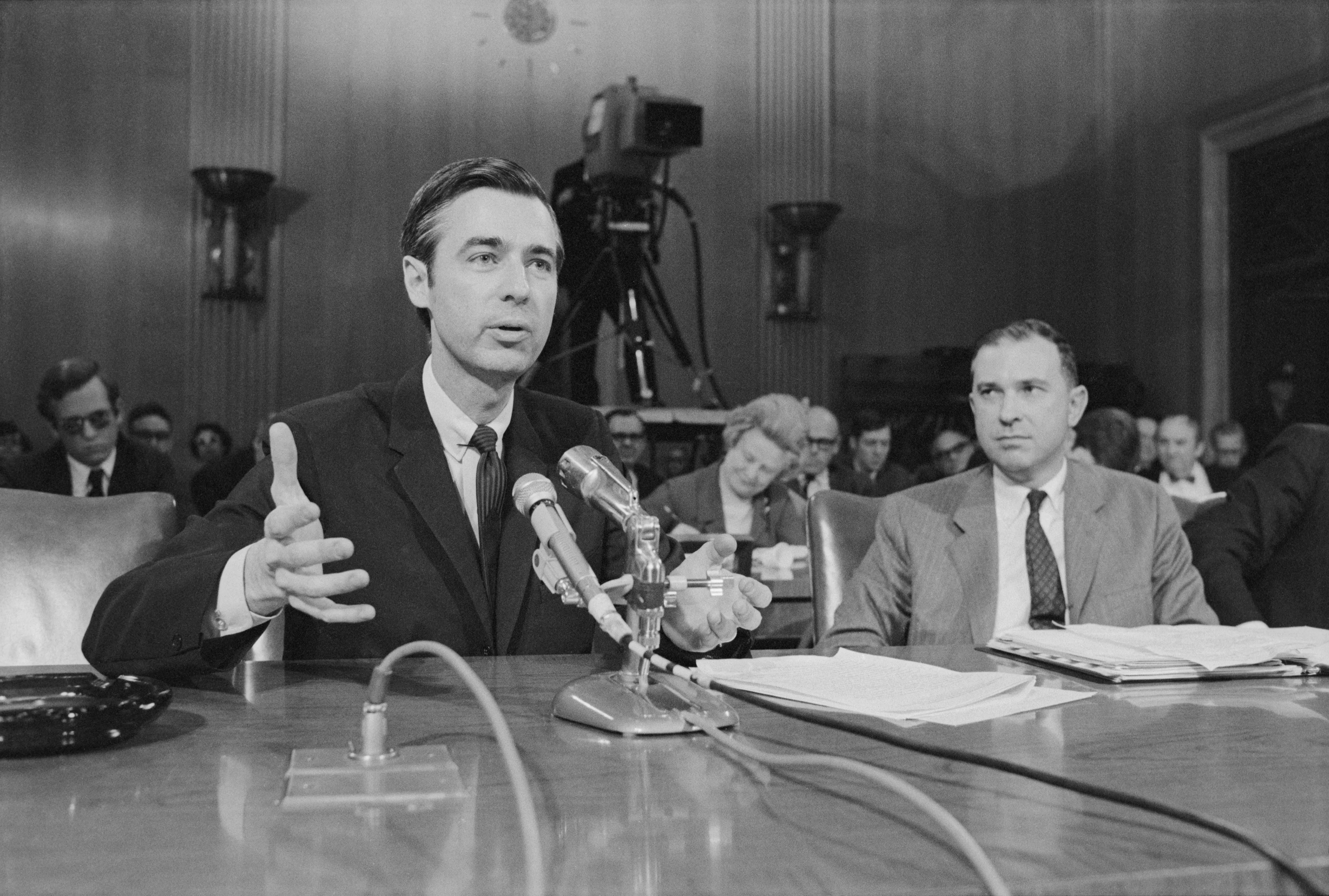
- Fred Rogers testifying before the Senate Subcommittee on Communications, May 1, 1969
- Date: May 1, 1969
- Time: Approx. 6 minutes
- Location: United States Senate, Washington, D.C.
- Participants: Fred Rogers, Senator John Pastore, U.S. Senate Subcommittee on Communications
- Outcome: Full $20 million funding granted to the Corporation for Public Broadcasting

On May 1, 1969, Fred Rogers, the creator and host of Mister Rogers' Neighborhood, testified before the United States Senate Commerce Subcommittee on Telecommunications and Media to oppose a proposed 50% reduction in federal funding for public broadcasting. President Richard Nixon's administration had suggested cutting the budget from $20 million to $10 million. Rogers's six-minute testimony emphasized the emotional and educational value of children's programming, advocating for the importance of non-commercial media in child development. His sincere and composed delivery notably influenced United States Senator John Pastore, the subcommittee's chair, who responded favorably to Rogers's appeal. The testimony is credited with securing the full $20 million funding and is regarded as a pivotal moment in the history of public broadcasting in the United States.

== Context ==
In the late 1960s, the United States sought to enhance educational and cultural programming accessible to the public. This initiative led to the enactment of the Public Broadcasting Act of 1967, which established the Corporation for Public Broadcasting (CPB). The CPB was designed as a private, nonprofit corporation to promote and support public broadcasting.

By 1969, the CPB relied heavily on federal funding to support its initiatives. U.S. President Lyndon Johnson had proposed a $20 million bill for the creation of the Public Broadcasting Service (PBS) before he left office, but his successor, Richard Nixon, wanted to cut the funding to $10 million amidst the Vietnam War. This proposal raised concerns among educators, broadcasters, and the public, who feared that such a reduction would hinder the growth and accessibility of educational content.

In response to the proposed budget cuts, the Senate Subcommittee on Communications held hearings to discuss the implications of reduced funding for public broadcasting. Fred Rogers, the creator and host of Mister Rogers' Neighborhood, was invited to testify. The clip of Rogers's testimony, which was televised and has since been viewed by millions of people on the internet, helped to secure funding for PBS for many years afterward. He appeared before the subcommittee on May 1, 1969.

== Rogers's testimony ==
Testimony

Rogers, who at the time was relatively unknown, began his testimony by stating that he had a written statement but preferred to speak extemporaneously to convey his message more personally. His program, Mister Rogers' Neighborhood, had a budget of $6,000 at the time. Rogers emphasized the importance of nurturing children's emotional and moral development, which he believed public television uniquely supported. He described his program's approach to helping children deal with complex emotions, such as anger and fear, in constructive ways.

Rogers highlighted his commitment to children's emotional and moral development, stating, "I give an expression of care every day to each child to help him realize that he is unique." He emphasized the importance of helping children manage difficult emotions, particularly anger, through constructive means. To illustrate this, he recited the lyrics of his song "What Do You Do with the Mad that You Feel?" He explained that the song was inspired by a question from a young boy and was intended to help children understand and express their emotions safely.

Throughout his six-minute testimony, Rogers maintained a calm and sincere demeanor, which contrasted with the often formal atmosphere of congressional hearings. His heartfelt appeal resonated with the subcommittee's chair, Senator John Pastore, who was initially skeptical of Rogers's appeal. After listening to Rogers's presentation, Pastore, who was brought to tears, remarked: "I think it's wonderful. I think it's wonderful. Looks like you just earned the $20 million."

== Aftermath and legacy ==
According to King, Rogers's testimony was "considered one of the most powerful pieces of testimony ever offered before Congress, and one of the most powerful pieces of video presentation ever filmed", and has been studied by public relations experts and academics. Congressional funding for PBS increased from $9 million to $22 million soon after Rogers's testimony. In 1970, Nixon appointed Rogers to the chair of the White House Conference on Children and Youth.

Videos of Rogers's testimony have experienced repeated resurgences since 2012. It first resurfaced in 2012, after then-presidential candidate Mitt Romney suggested cutting funding for PBS. In 2017, videos of the testimony again went viral after President Donald Trump proposed defunding several arts-related government programs including PBS and the National Endowment for the Arts. The testimony again received revived attention in 2025 after Trump signed an executive order in May cutting funding for the Corporation for Public Broadcasting, which funds PBS and NPR. In March 2026, a Judge blocked Donald Trump’s administration order to cut funding to NPR and PBS, ruling it unconstitutional and a violation of First Amendment rights.
