= Nicholas Ma =

Film producer and director

- Born: 1983
- Education: New York University Tisch School of the Arts, Harvard College
- Occupations: Film producer, film director
- Employer: McKinsey & Company (–2013)
- Notable work: Won't You Be My Neighbor?
- Father: Yo-Yo Ma

Nicholas Ma (born circa 1983) is a film director and producer who is best known for producing the 2018 award-winning documentary Won't You Be My Neighbor?.

He was born around 1983 to Yo-Yo Ma and Jill Hornor. He has one sibling, Emily Ma who was born around 1985. Nicholas Ma attended Harvard University and graduated in 2005. He went on to work at McKinsey & Company at both their New York City and Shanghai locations. He also worked with Senator John Kerry on the Senate Foreign Relations Committee focusing on global economic policy. In 2013, he left McKinsey & Company. He later went back to school and attended New York University Tisch School of the Arts and received a Master of Fine Arts in Film & Television in 2017. Ma, alongside Morgan Neville and Caryn Capotosto, produced Neville's 2018 award-winning documentary Won't You Be My Neighbor?. Ma and Neville had interacted before on Neville's 2015 documentary The Music of Strangers, which was about the Silk Road Ensemble formed by Ma's father.

In 2019, Ma's 15-minute documentary short Suite No. 1, Prelude was shown at DOC NYC, which focused on his father's re-recording of the first cello piece he learned. Also in 2019, Ma's first feature film Mabel won the Alfred P. Sloan Foundation award of $100,000 and was also supported by the Tribeca Film Institute's Sloan Filmmaker Fund. Mabel focuses on a young child's friendship with a potted plant and her teacher who introduced her to botany. Mabel was co-written with Joy Goodwin. Actors such as Christine Ko, Judy Greer, and Lexi Perkel are all slated to star in Mabel. In 2022, Ma worked with Alison Klayman on the documentary Unfinished Business, which focused on the New York Liberty women's basketball team and the WNBA. Unfinished Business was shown at the 2022 Tribeca Film Festival.

In November 2026, Lee, alongside Spike Lee and Clara Wu Tsai, started a new film festival called "Playback: The Brooklyn Watch Party."
