= Fred Rogers Productions =

American non-profit organization and television company

- Founded: 1954; 72 years ago (as Small World Enterprises); February 6, 1971; 55 years ago (current non-profit company)
- Type: Non-profit; Television Production; Film Production
- Tax ID no.: 25-1215087
- Legal status: 501(c)(3)
- Location: Pittsburgh, Pennsylvania, United States
- Website: fredrogers.org
- Formerly called: Small World Enterprises, Inc. (1954–1971); Family Communications, Inc. (1971–2010); The Fred Rogers Company (2010–2018)

The Fred Rogers Company, doing business as Fred Rogers Productions, is an American non-profit organization and production company specializing in children's programming for public television in the United States. Founded by Fred Rogers, it was initially renamed The Fred Rogers Company in his honor after his death. It produced its flagship program, Mister Rogers' Neighborhood, under its previous name, Family Communications, Inc.

Founded in 1954 as Small World Enterprises, a for-profit company primarily to license and sell merchandise connected with Mister Rogers' Neighborhood and his earlier series, The Children's Corner. Its first book they published was Our Small World. The company made its national breakout when Small World Enterprises launched its first television series on NET, Mister Rogers' Neighborhood, which was a blockbuster success. In 1970, Sam Silberman, who worked for WQED, briefly worked for the company, he left in 1971.

In 1971, it was reorganized and renamed as a non-profit company Family Communications, Inc., which kept the staff of Small World, which was officially took effect on November 1, 1971. When the flagship series was on hiatus, the company briefly pivoted toward television specials from 1976 to 1979.

In 1985, it struck a deal with CBS/Fox Video to release home video titles under the Mister Rogers Home Video label. In 2005, it struck a deal with Anchor Bay Entertainment to release titles on home video.

Following the death of Fred Rogers in 2003, the company would be headed by his widow Joanne until her death in 2021. In 2010, the company was renamed to The Fred Rogers Company, and eight years later, the company was renamed from The Fred Rogers Company to Fred Rogers Productions.

Since the early 2010s, The Fred Rogers Company has produced new children's programming, including:

- Daniel Tiger's Neighborhood, an animated conceptual sequel to Neighborhood starring the young families of characters introduced in the former show's Neighborhood of Make-Believe segments
- Peg + Cat, an animated show based on the picture book The Chicken Problem, introducing concepts of math and problem-solving to young viewers
- Odd Squad, a live-action show focusing on math and problem-solving, targeting a somewhat older audience than Peg + Cat
- Donkey Hodie, in association with Spiffy Pictures, which premiered on PBS Kids on May 3, 2021, following the titular character, the granddaughter of the original character appearing in the "Neighborhood of Make Believe" segments of Mister Rogers' Neighborhood
- Alma's Way, created by Sesame Street actress Sonia Manzano which premiered on PBS Kids on October 4, 2021

== Filmography ==
- Mister Rogers' Neighborhood (1968–2001)
- Old Friends ... New Friends (1978–1980)
- Daniel Tiger's Neighborhood (2012–present)
- Peg + Cat (2013–2018)
- Odd Squad (2014–present)
- Odd Squad: The Movie (2016)
- Through the Woods (2017)
- A Beautiful Day in the Neighborhood (2019; uncredited)
- Donkey Hodie (2021–present)
- Alma's Way (2021–present)
