= Johnny Costa =

American jazz pianist (1922–1996)

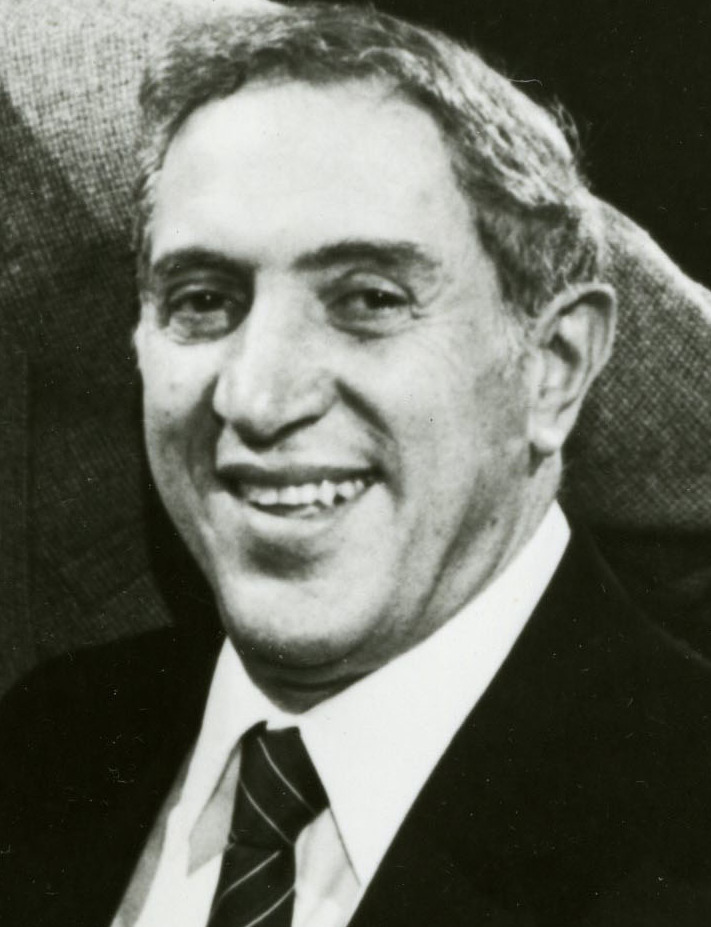

Background information
- Born: John Costanza; January 18, 1922; Arnold, Pennsylvania, U.S.
- Died: October 11, 1996 (aged 74) Pittsburgh, Pennsylvania, U.S.
- Genre: Jazz
- Occupations: Musician, music director
- Instruments: Piano, celesta, synth, accordion
- Years active: 1929–1996
- Label: Warner Bros. Records

Johnny Costa (born John Costanza; January 18, 1922 – October 11, 1996) was an American jazz pianist. Given the title "The White Art Tatum" by fellow jazz pianist Art Tatum, Costa is best known for his work as musical director of the children's television series Mister Rogers' Neighborhood.

== Biography ==
Costa was raised in Arnold, Pennsylvania. His father, an Italian-born laborer, helped fund his son's music studies by selling the family home to purchase him an accordion. Costa learned to play accordion at age seven and was reading music three years later. Frank Oliver, Costa's high school music teacher, urged him to learn the piano after discovering that Costa had perfect pitch. After high school, he performed in the Pittsburgh area and joined a New York City orchestra.

In 1942, Costa was drafted into the Army and served as a medic during World War II. He attended Carnegie Mellon University on the G.I. Bill, earning degrees in music and in education. In case he failed as a musician, Costa prepared himself to teach. On the day of his graduation, he began work as the house pianist for a radio station in Pittsburgh. Eventually he performed the same role for KDKA-TV in Pittsburgh, where he worked for sixteen years. He provided piano and organ music for many programs.

Costa's first recording was The Amazing Johnny Costa, a Savoy LP released in 1955 and reissued on CD as Neighborhood in 1989. Although his increasingly lucrative career was beginning to bring him international attention, the amount of time away from his family and friends led him to live and perform only in western Pennsylvania. He stopped traveling and gave up his job as musical director of The Mike Douglas Show. He returned to Pittsburgh and remained there for the rest of his life.

Costa appeared along with guitarist Joe Negri on the 1954 Ken Griffin TV series 67 Melody Lane. Johnny and Joe played two numbers, "After You've Gone" and "Little Brown Jug", the latter with Ken Griffin at the organ.

=== Mister Rogers' Neighborhood ===
Costa served as musical director, arranger, and keyboardist for the children's television series Mister Rogers' Neighborhood from the show's debut in 1968 until his death in 1996. The show's creator and host, Fred Rogers, regarded Costa as one of the most gifted musicians he had ever met. Rogers' choice was surprising because Costa's style was regarded as too complicated and sophisticated for a children's show. Costa accepted the job without hesitation because it wouldn't require him to travel away from Pittsburgh, and because Rogers offered him the same amount he needed to pay his son's college tuition ($5,000).

Although Mister Rogers' Neighborhood was a children's show, Costa made it a point not to play "kiddie" music. He believed children understood good music and that he could experiment with his own musical styles and techniques, even for a kids' show. Costa enjoyed full musical freedom on Mister Rogers' Neighborhood. He also arranged and harmonized music that Rogers, a trained musician, wrote for the show. Each day, Costa and his trio (Carl McVicker Jr. on bass, Bobby Rawsthorne on percussion) played live in the studio for the filming. In addition to the show's recognizable main theme, they played the trolley whistle, Mr. McFeely's frenetic Speedy Delivery piano plonks, the vibraphone flute-toots (on a synthesizer) as Fred fed his fish, dreamy celesta lines, incidental music, and Rogers' entrance and exit tunes.

== Death and legacy ==
Costa died of aplastic anemia in Pittsburgh, Pennsylvania, at the age of 74.

After his death, Michael Moricz took over as musical director on Mister Rogers' Neighborhood until the show ended in 2001. Much of Costa's music continued to be used, including the celesta music at the beginning of each episode. At Moricz's request, the show's closing credits continued to list Costa alongside Moricz as its musical directors.
