= Joanne Rogers =

Musician and wife of Fred Rogers

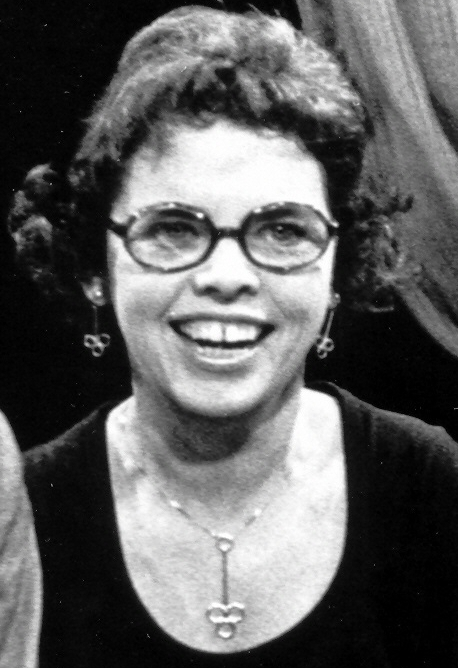
- Joanne Rogers on Mister Rogers' Neighborhood on April 25, 1975.
- Born: Sara Joanne Byrd; March 9, 1928; Jacksonville, Florida, U.S.
- Died: January 14, 2021 (aged 92); Squirrel Hill, Pittsburgh, Pennsylvania, U.S.
- Education: B.A. music, Rollins College; Master of Music, Florida State University; Honorary degree, Duquesne University, 2019
- Occupations: Musician; actress; pianist; teacher
- Years active: 1970s–2019
- Known for: Wife of Fred Rogers, later head of Fred Rogers Productions
- Spouse: Fred Rogers (m. 1952; died 2003)
- Children: 2

Sara Joanne Rogers (née Byrd; March 9, 1928 – January 14, 2021) was an American musician who was the wife of television host and minister Fred Rogers.

== Biography ==
Sara Joanne Byrd was born in Jacksonville, Florida, to Wyatt Adolphus Byrd, a coffee salesman who later worked for the United States Postal Service and Ebra Edwards Byrd, a housewife who shared her love of music. Joanne liked to play ragtime on the piano, and did so by ear. She began taking piano lessons at the age of 5.

She studied music at Rollins College in Winter Park, Florida, where she earned a bachelor's degree in piano performance. It was also there that she met her future husband, Fred Rogers.

She went on to earn a master's degree in music at Florida State University. She studied with Hungarian composer and conductor Ernst von Dohnányi.

In 1952, she and Rogers married. Rogers was an American television host and producer, and would go on to create the popular children's TV series Mister Rogers' Neighborhood. They had two sons together, James Byrd Rogers and John Rogers.

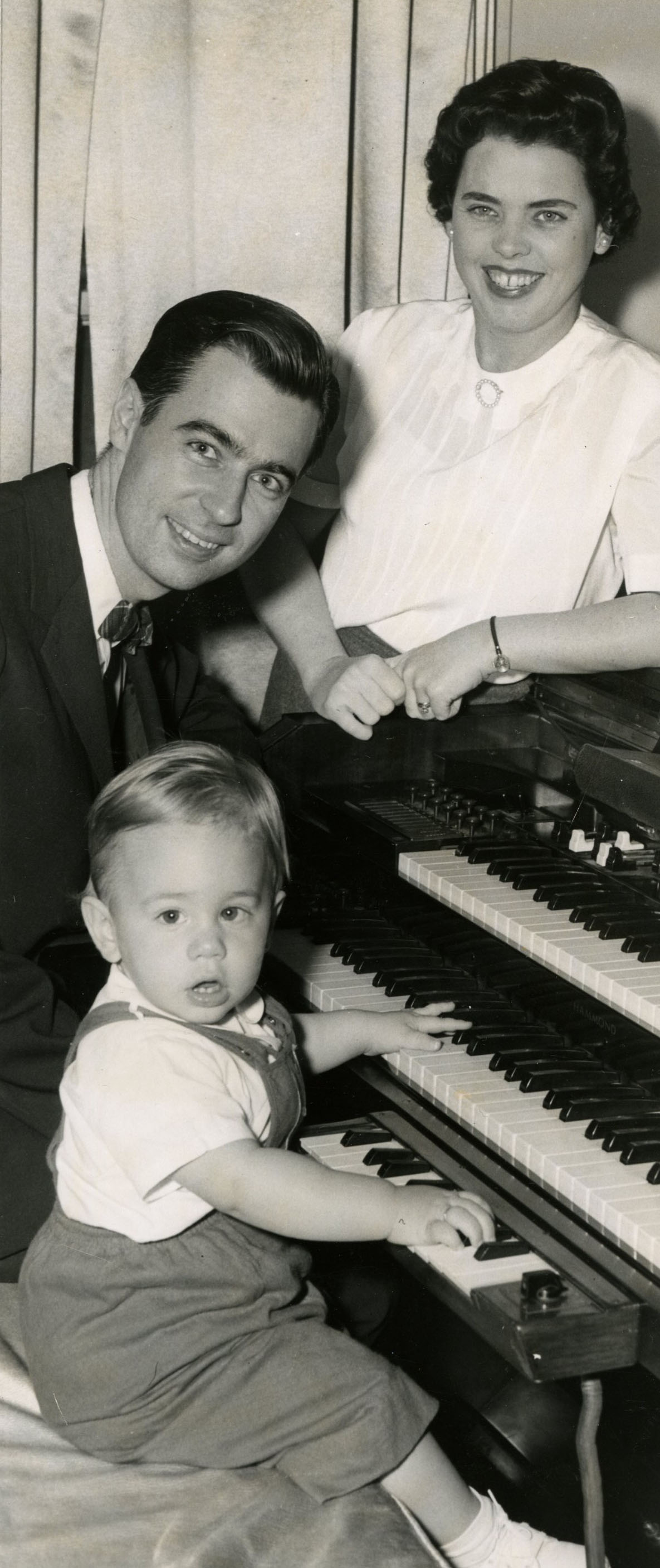
Fred and Joanne Rogers and their son James, November 17, 1960.

Joanne taught at Chatham College's preparatory school of music in the 1950s. In the early 1970s, she taught for four years at Carlow College. In 2019, she received an honorary degree from Duquesne University.

She died on January 14, 2021, at her home in Squirrel Hill, Pittsburgh, Pennsylvania at the age of 92.

== Professional career ==
=== Music ===
As a duo concert pianist Joanne performed with her longtime friend, Jeannine Morrison, from Georgia. They began performing concerts in the 1970s. The musicians recorded two albums, Duo-Piano Favorites and A Virtuoso Duo-Piano Showcase. She retired from her musical career around 2016 due to arthritis.

=== Television ===
Joanne voiced several characters in Fred Rogers' first television show, The Children's Corner. She also made a few appearances in Mister Rogers' Neighborhood as Mrs. Rogers.

Known for her charismatic laugh, Joanne Rogers embodied her husband's television legacy after his death in 2003, notably through the actions of Fred Rogers Productions. She embarked on her first media tour in 2003, to promote the release of The World According to Mister Rogers: Important Things to Remember, a collection of his speeches and other writings.

She became president of the company, and helped hire Kevin Morrison as chief operating officer. She helped develop and launch Daniel Tiger's Neighborhood, a PBS Kids hit since its premiere in 2012.

She appeared on late night talk shows to promote the publication of books and documentaries about her husband and his iconic show Mister Rogers' Neighborhood.

In 2018, Joanne Rogers was asked to participate in the 50th anniversary celebration of Mister Rogers' Neighborhood. In 2019, she was portrayed by actress Maryann Plunkett in Marielle Heller's film A Beautiful Day in the Neighborhood.

== Discography ==
- 1995: A Virtuoso Duo-Piano Showcase, Jeannine Morrison and Joanne Rogers, ACA Digital Recordings
- 1997: Duo-Piano Favorites, Jeannine Morrison and Joanne Rogers, ACA Digital Recordings
