= Lorin Hollander =

American classical concert pianist

- Born: July 19, 1944 (age 82); New York City, U.S.
- Occupation: Pianist
- Spouse: Tara
- Children: 3

Lorin Hollander (born July 19, 1944) is an American classical concert pianist. He has performed with virtually all of the major symphony orchestras in the United States and many around the world. A New York Times critic called him in 1964 "the leading pianist of his generation."

== Early life ==
Lorin Hollander was born in New York City into a Jewish family. His father, Max Hollander, was associate concertmaster of the NBC Symphony Orchestra under Arturo Toscanini. Lorin Hollander was a child prodigy and gave his first public performance at age five playing excerpts of Bach's The Well-Tempered Clavier, and at age eleven, he made his Carnegie Hall debut with the National Orchestral Association.

He studied with Eduard Steuermann from age eight and took courses at what is now the Juilliard Pre-College at age eleven. His subsequent mentors were Max Rudolf and Leon Fleisher and he spent two summers at Marlboro working with Rudolf Serkin. He also worked periodically with Olga Stroumillo. He transferred from public school to Professional Children's School when he was thirteen, and graduated at sixteen.

== Musical career ==
Beginning in 1959, Hollander toured regularly, performing as soloist with symphonies and in recital around the United States and Canada. He made a last-minute substitution for Van Cliburn as soloist with the San Antonio Symphony at age 14. In the same year, Hollander made his international debut with the Montreal Symphony Orchestra. He also began making appearances on national television, including The Perry Como Show, The Bell Telephone Hour, and the following year on The Ed Sullivan Show. He began making critically acclaimed recordings for RCA in 1958. In 1961 he performed with the New York Philharmonic under the baton of Leonard Bernstein, and appearances with conductors such as Copland, Haitink, Leinsdorf, Levine, Mehta, Monteux, Ormandy, Ozawa, Previn, Schwarz and Szell continued throughout his career.

Hollander was the only soloist on the World Tour of the Cincinnati Symphony Orchestra with conductor Max Rudolf in 1966 presented by the Department of State. His appearances in Europe began in 1965, when he made a recording in London of Aram Khachaturian's piano concerto and Ernest Bloch's Scherzo Fantasque with the Royal Philharmonic Orchestra and conductor André Previn. In 1968 he debuted with the Concertgebouw Orchestra. Hollander has also performed with the orchestras of Boston, Chicago, Cleveland, Dallas, Detroit, Los Angeles, New York, Philadelphia, Pittsburgh, San Francisco and Washington's National Symphony, and internationally with the London Philharmonic, Royal Concertgebouw, Orchestre de la Suisse Romande, Jerusalem Symphony Orchestra, ORTF and New Tokyo Philharmonic.

In 1969, Hollander gave the first public classical recital using the Baldwin Electronic Concert Grand at the Fillmore East, a venue that usually hosted rock concerts, where he hoped to expose his young contemporaries to classical music. The amplified piano was chosen because of the hall's unsatisfactory acoustics. Hollander played pieces by Debussy, Bach, and Prokofiev, and himself. In 1971 he was the first classical pianist to give street concerts in East Harlem and in Queens, under the auspices of the Department of Cultural Affairs.

Hollander premiered Norman Dello Joio's Fantasy and Variations and the RCA recording with the Boston Symphony Orchestra with Erich Leinsdorf conducting was nominated for a Grammy in 1964. Other premieres of new classical works related to Hollander's career include Gunther Schuller's Concerto for 3 Hands, which was written for Hollander and Leon Fleisher (1990).

Among Hollander's students is the American composer Richard Danielpour.

== Educator ==
Hollander is also known for his advocacy of the arts in education; he has testified before the U.S. Congress and many state legislatures and created some of the first models of community outreach and university residencies for the National Endowment of the Arts, American Symphony Orchestra League, and the National Association for Music Education (formerly Music Educators National Conference). Hollander was an advisor to the U.S. Office of the Gifted and Talented, the World Congress on the Gifted, and the Commission on Presidential Scholars. A special educational session with students from Philadelphia's Edison High, then an inner city school, was taped for an hour-long NET-TV special in 1970 titled Up Against the Wall. Hollander was a member of the Rockefeller Panel on the Arts, Education and Americans for the American Council for the Arts in Education and in 1977 a panel report "Coming to Our Senses" was published.

He has also worked with organizations including the Social Science Research Council, the International Federation of Music Therapy, International Transpersonal Association, and the American Psychiatric Association.

In recognition of Hollander's work in arts education, the Tennessee Arts Academy, an arts in education program of the Tennessee Department of Education, created the Lorin Hollander Award, which is given to a Tennessean whose influence has benefited arts education.

== Awards and recognitions ==
Hollander has received honorary doctoral degrees from the University of Maine, Buena Vista College and Ithaca College. The Institute for Music and Neurologic Function recognized Lorin Hollander with the 2003 Music Has Power Award for his advocacy of music and healing. The award is given for: significant accomplishments by exceptional individuals who have brought new understanding to the use of the power of music to awaken and heal. He is an honorary Fellow of the Joseph Campbell Foundation.

== Personal life ==
Hollander is the father of three sons, Jesse, Joshua and Aaron. He resides in Mid Coast Maine with his wife, Tara.

== Selected discography ==
- Discovering the Piano, A Guide to Piano Playing: 22 Favorites for Students of All Ages RCA Camden (1958)
- Polonaise, Lorin Hollander, Pianist RCA Camden (1959)
- Dello Joio, "Fantasy and Variation" and Ravel "Concerto in G," Boston Symphony Orchestra, Erich Leinsdorf, Conductor, RCA Victor (1963)
- Prokofieff Piano Concerto No. 5, Lorin Hollander, Violin Concerto No. 1, Erick Friedman, Boston Symphony Orchestra, Erich Leinsdorf, Conductor RCA Victor (1964)
- Khachaturian Piano Concerto / Bloch Scherzo Fantasque Royal Philharmonic Orchestra – André Previn, Conductor, RCA Victor (1965)
- Mussorgsky: Pictures at an Exhibition RCA Victor (1965)
- A Lorin Hollander Concert – Bach: Jesu Joy of Man’s Desiring; Beethoven: "Tempest" Sonata; Brahms: Intermezzo in B-flat minor; Schumann: Arabeske, RCA Victor (1966)
- Lorin Hollander at the Fillmore East - Prokofiev: Sonata No. 7; Bach: Partita No. 6; Debussy: "Fireworks"; Hollander: Toccata, "Up Against the Wall," Angel (1969)
- Copland "Piano Concerto," Lorin Hollander with the Seattle Symphony, Gerard Schwarz, Conductor, Delos (1995), reissued by Naxos (2012)

== Television and film ==
- The Bell Telephone Hour 1959 - 1965
- The Perry Como Show 1959, 1961 - 1963
- The Ed Sullivan Show 1960
- The Merv Griffin Show - Season 6, Episode 155 - April 4, 1969
- The Merv Griffin Show - Season 7, Episode 32 - September 30, 1969
- The Merv Griffin Show - Season 7, Episode 80 - December 8, 1969
- Episode Old Friends...New Friends with interviewing host Fred Rogers 1978
- Sophie's Choice - Performer, Jesu, Joy of Man's Desiring & Lieder ohne Worte 1982
- DVD Great Pianists on the Bell Telephone Hour: 1959-1967, VAI 2002 DVD
