= WQED =

WQED may refer to:

- WQED (TV), a television station (channel 13 virtual 4 digital) licensed to Pittsburgh, Pennsylvania, United States
- WQED-FM, a radio station (89.3 FM) licensed to Pittsburgh, Pennsylvania, United States
- The stations' parent company, WQED Multimedia, or their production facility at 4802 Fifth Avenue in Pittsburgh's Oakland neighborhood.

== See also ==
- KQED (disambiguation)
- QED (disambiguation)
