= Ricki & Copper =

US television program

Ricki & Copper (1959–1969) was a popular local children's program that ran weekday mornings on WTAE-TV in Pittsburgh, Pennsylvania, and was one of two locally produced children's shows that aired on WTAE, the other being Paul Shannon's Adventure Time, which aired in the afternoon. The show was originally an offshoot of another local program, The Comedy Show which ran from 1958 to 1959.

== Format ==
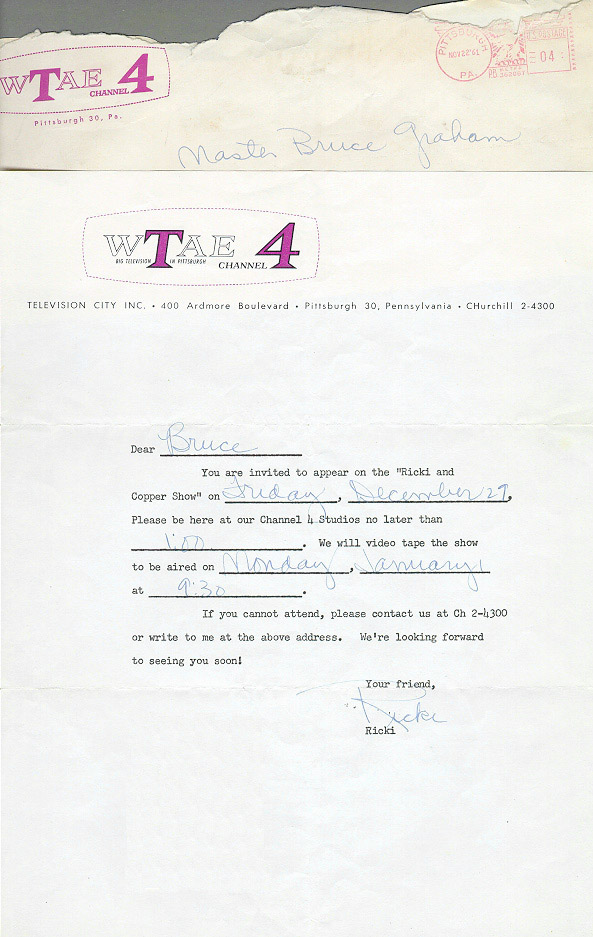
An invitation letter to appear on the show, from 1961.

The series was hosted by Ricki Wertz and "Copper", a half whippet, half Golden Retriever with reddish hair, who in real life was owned by Wertz. The live program featured children in the audience and like most children shows back in the day featured fun, games, safety tips and cartoons. She would also reward her audience with Hostess cupcakes after chanting "Ala-ka-zaam, Ka-zaam, Ka-zoom!" during every show.

Other characters on the program included a puppet called Mr. Boom-Man (who was attached to a boom microphone), which was created by Wertz's husband, Tom Borden. Mr. Boom-Man was intended to help Wertz keep the mostly four to eight year olds focused on the camera and not on Copper, who viewers believed was the actual star of the show.

In addition to the morning show, Wertz hosted a midday edition, Ricki & Magoo, a 15-minute program where she introduced Mr. Magoo cartoons after WTAE's noon newscast.

== Final years ==
In 1967, a stroke resulted in Copper becoming paralyzed and leading them to be euthanized that same year. Another dog, a golden retriever with reddish hair known as "Copper Penny", would become the new "Copper".

By 1969, Wertz decided to stop presenting "Ricki & Copper" after becoming a full-time mother following the premature birth of her daughter. Wertz continued to host another WTAE program, Junior High Quiz, until it ended its run in 1982.

== Legacy ==
Even though the episodes have thought to be bulked-erased, Pittsburghers today still remember the series. In December 2014, a rare full-length episode of the program that WTAE had taped was posted on the station's website.

== See also ==
- List of local children's television series
