= QED =

QED may refer to:

== Mathematics and science ==
- Q.E.D. (quod erat demonstrandum), used at the end of a mathematical proof
- Quantum electrodynamics, a field in particle physics
- QED manifesto and project, a database of mathematical knowledge
- QED: The Strange Theory of Light and Matter, a 1985 physics book by Richard Feynman
- Work (electric field), often represented as W=qEd

== Computing and electronics ==
- QEMU Enhanced Disk, a deprecated disk image format for machine emulation and virtualization
- QED (text editor), a 1960s line-oriented editor
- Quantum Effect Devices, a microprocessor design company

== Arts, entertainment, media ==
=== Literature ===
- Quod Erat Demonstrandum, a 1903 novel by Gertrude Stein
- Q.E.D. (novel), a 1930 mystery novel by Lynn Brock
- Q.E.D. (manga), a 1997 manga by Motohiro Katou

=== Albums ===
- QED (band), a 1980s Australian band
- Q.E.D. (Terje Rypdal album), 1993
- Q.E.D. (Jim Allchin album)
- Q.E.D. (Acid Black Cherry album), 2009
- QED Records or Emanem Records

=== Stage and screen ===
- Quod Erat Demonstrandum (film), a 2013 Romanian drama film
- QED (play), a 2001 play by Peter Parnell about Richard Feynman
- QED International, a film company

==== Television ====
- KQED (TV), public television station in San Francisco, California, USA; also known as "QED"
- Q.E.D. (American TV series)
- Q.E.D. (British TV series)
- WQED (TV), public television station in Pittsburgh, Pennsylvania, USA; also known as "QED"

=== Radio ===
- KQED-FM (88.5), an NPR radio station in San Francisco, California, USA; also known as "QED"
- WQED-FM (89.3), an NPR radio station in Pittsburgh, Pennsylvania, USA; also known as "QED"

== Other uses ==
- Granville Gee Bee R-6, named "Q.E.D.", a 1930s racing monoplane
- QED: Question, Explore, Discover, annual skeptical conference held in Manchester, UK
- Quami Ekta Dal, a regional political party in India
- Quiet Electric Drive, a US Navy program to develop technologies for silent maritime propulsion

== See also ==
- KQED (disambiguation), including callsigns KQED -- QED in zone K
- WQED (disambiguation), including callsigns WQED -- QED in zone W
- CQED (disambiguation)
