= The Ocean - Five Years =

Documentary

The Ocean – Five Years
- Directed by: Jennifer Schlieper
- Produced by: Flying Scooter Productions
- Cinematography: Phil Atkins
- Edited by: Dylan White
- Music by: Brett McCutcheon & June Bracken
- Production company: Flying Scooter Productions
- Distributed by: WQED Pittsburgh
- Release date: 2024
- Running time: 40 minutes
- Country: United States
- Language: English

The Ocean – Five Years is a documentary produced by Flying Scooter Productions, that has been nominated and selected for multiple film festivals. The film highlights the creation and story behind Brett McCutcheon's emotional pop-symphonic EP, featuring members of the Pittsburgh Symphony Orchestra along with Chris Jamison and June Bracken. Created in memory of his late brother Ryan, the project explores themes of grief, loss, and enduring love.

As of September 2025, The Ocean – Five Years is available to stream on PBS Passport for free.

== About ==
In September 2017, Robert Morris University student and percussionist Ryan McCutcheon, age 19, was killed in a car accident. His younger brother, Brett McCutcheon, also a musician, turned to composition as a way to process his grief and preserve Ryan's legacy. Together with vocalist June Bracken, Brett developed the project The Ocean, a body of work blending classical orchestration and contemporary pop influences to explore themes of loss, memory, and healing.

Five years after Ryan's death, Brett released The Ocean (Five Years), an expanded version of the original music featuring songs by Chris Jamison. In addition, the album was accompanied by a documentary film of the same name, The Ocean – 5 Years follows the album's track sequence, integrates stories from friends, family, and community members impacted by Ryan's passing. Both the music and film aim to honor Ryan's life while fostering dialogue around grief, resilience, and the role of music education in healing.

== Production ==
The McCutcheon family became involved in music-related projects following the death of their son, Ryan McCutcheon, who was killed in a car accident approximately six months after his family began working with a creative team on studio branding. The funeral drew hundreds of students, teachers, friends, and family, and in the aftermath, the McCutcheons established a foundation, The Rythm19 Fund, in Ryan's honor and opened their music studio, The Vault, to children who had not previously had access to musical instruction.

Ryan's younger brother, Brett McCutcheon, continued his studies at Slippery Rock University and pursued music composition in Ryan's memory. In 2017, Brett and his family developed a project titled The Ocean, which included a three-track EP and a five-minute video. The project centered on themes of grief and remembrance and gained recognition among family, friends, and local audiences.

During the COVID-19 pandemic, the McCutcheon family organized creative initiatives with assistance from collaborators. These included pro bono scripting and editing projects to honor frontline workers, as well as an online 12-hour concert that raised funds for hospitality workers affected by economic shutdowns.

Brett McCutcheon subsequently began developing new music that expanded upon The Ocean. The reworked compositions involved orchestration and additional thematic material focused on grief, recovery, and hope. The family collaborated with musicians from the Pittsburgh Symphony Orchestra to record orchestral accompaniments. Filming of the recording sessions was integrated into a documentary-style production, The Ocean – Five Years, which also included interviews and video diaries from Brett explaining the creative process.

The documentary was produced by Flying Scooter Productions, an Emmy‑nominated, award‑winning women‑owned film and brand strategy studio based in Pittsburgh, Pennsylvania. Founded in 2017 by producing partners Jennifer Schlieper and Courtney Gumpf, the company specializes in directing and producing documentary films, commercials, and branded media content. The McCutcheon family initially approached Schlieper to assist with creative development for a music video accompanying Brett McCutcheon’s compositions, and director Jennifer Schlieper subsequently expanded the collaboration into a full‑length documentary to explore its deeper themes of grief and healing. Producer Waya Slater also contributed to the project as a member of the Flying Scooter team. The Flying Scooter Productions team managed the filming as director, producers, scripting, and editiing and coordination with the McCutcheon family. The Ocean – Five Years represents the company’s first film festival release, later selected at multiple international festivals.

The documentary's narrative structure aligned with the sequence of musical tracks: "Intro", "Sinking", "The Bottom", "Floating", and "The Shore". According to the production notes, the filming style included direct acknowledgments of the camera, minimal lighting, and deliberate pauses intended to reflect the nature of grief. Visual elements also incorporated symbolic references to Ryan McCutcheon, such as leaving space within frames to signify the void that is felt in his absence.

The project additionally included the participation of Highmark Caring Place, a Pittsburgh-based organization providing support for grieving children and families. Executive director, Terese LaVallee, contributed to the film, sharing the philosophies of the center that were influenced by Mr. Rogers. She reflects on Brett McCutcheon's experiences attending the center following his brother's death.

Filming occurred in the summer of 2023, with editing completed in early 2024. Brett McCutcheon composed the score for the film, which was finalized in January 2024. The score featured recurring motifs, including a sustained low hum described by the production team as representing emotional continuity throughout the narrative.

The film's central themes address grief, resilience, and the sustaining role of music within personal and communal healing.

== Release ==
The film's first broadcast was on July 10, 2025 on WQED, with a repeat viewing on July 11. Prior to this, Lindsay Theatre, August Wilson African American Cultural Center, and Duquesne University held public viewings.

In 2024, the documentary was selected for six film festivals:

- Vienna Independent Film Festival
- Milan Film Festival
- Red Rose Film Festival
- Toronto International Women's Film Festival
- Venice Shorts
- Pittsburgh Shorts and Script Competition

In 2025, the documentary was selected for four more film festivals, including:

- Documentaries Without Borders International Film Festival
- Berlin Lift-Off Film Festival
- Cleveland International Film Festival
- Cordillera International Film Festival

As of late 2025, the documentary is now streaming on PBS Passport.

== Awards ==
The documentary has won numerous awards including:

- Best Documentary at the Vienna Independent Film Festival
- The Audience Award at the Pittsburgh Shorts and Script Competition.
- Silver Anthem Award in Education, Art, and Culture.
