= Fox Learning Systems =

American e-learning and multimedia training company

- Type: Private
- Industry: Elder Care
- Founded: Fox Farsight - Sept. 8, 1997; Fox Learning Systems - 2003
- Headquarters: Pittsburgh, Pennsylvania
- Products: E-Learning, Video Production
- Website: www.foxlearningsystems.com

Fox Learning Systems is an American e-learning and multimedia training company based in Pittsburgh, Pennsylvania.

== Founding ==
Debra Fox is a former news anchor for WTAE-TV, the Pittsburgh ABC affiliate. She founded Fox Learning Systems after witnessing the training problems plaguing the long term care industry. "If you do training well enough, people will learn," said Fox in an interview with Seton Hill University's E-Magnify journal. She has won numerous awards for her work with Fox Learning Systems. She also publishes a blog related to the elder care industry

== Studies ==
Fox Learning Systems has conducted and participated in numerous studies related to psychiatric learning and elder care. The National Institute of Health as well as the National Institute of Mental Health has awarded grants to Fox Learning Systems to study a variety of aspects in the eldercare field. For example, in 2002 the National Institute of Health awarded $566,000 to Fox Learning Systems for two research grants.

- In 2002, Fox Learning Systems conducted a 6-month randomized experiment comparing computer-based and lecture-based learning for nursing-home staff education. This study was conducted to find if interactive multimedia training would be feasible for compliance training in nursing homes.
- In 2003, Fox Learning Systems provided the educational component of a study to improve quality of care and quality of life in nursing homes. Pressure ulcers were dramatically reduced. In addition, using the animation, the nursing staff learned to identify early stage pressure ulcers in different skin tones. Prior to this study, African-American nursing home residents with one pressure ulcer were likely to have multiple ulcers whereas this was not the case for Caucasian residents. After the education, no one, white or black, had more than a single pressure ulcer.
- In 2004 Fox Learning Systems conducted a study based on the Hamilton Depression Rating Scale to see if actors could effectively portray depressed patients. Their findings have been published in the American Journal of Psychiatry. Through this study Fox Learning System launched accupsych.com a learning system that can be used to train research raters.
- In 2005, Drs. Eric Lenze of Washington University in St. Louis and colleagues conducted a study to determine if stroke victims could identify their own risk factors for stroke after completing inpatient physical rehabilitation. Surprisingly, the majority of patients were unaware of their own risk factors and therefore were not in a position to change any lifestyle patterns that would reduce risk of a subsequent stroke. Dr. Lenze and his colleagues approached Fox Learning Systems, Inc with the challenge of developing an adaptive learning educational tool that stroke victims would be able to use with the computer compensating for specific neurological deficits.
- In 2005, Fox Learning Systems conducted an NIH funded study dealing with Electroconvulsive therapy. They produced an Interactive video to simplify and provide patient information on ECT.
- In 2008, Fox Learning Systems started phase two of their "Web Based Training for Families of Longterm Care". This seeks to assess family satisfaction, involvement, complaints, resident quality care and quality of life".
- In 2008, Fox Learning Systems started phase two of the NIH funded "Do Clinical Rehabilitation Education Programs Really Improve Stroke-Related Knowledge?". This is currently in the early stages of development with a time table of 3 years to completion.
