= Ricki Wertz =

American actress and television personality (1935–2021)

- Born: Ruth Elizabeth Wertz; 1935; Wilkes-Barre, Pennsylvania, U.S.
- Died: July 14, 2021 (aged 86); Chicago, Illinois, U.S.
- Occupation: Television personality
- Spouse: Tom Bordenkircher (m. 1954; died 2020)
- Children: 2

Ruth Elizabeth Wertz (1935 – July 14, 2021), known as Ricki Wertz, was an American actress and television personality. She was a pioneering figure in local television in Pittsburgh, Pennsylvania, appearing on several shows from the late 1950s until the 1980s. She was noted for hosting Ricki & Copper and Junior High Quiz.

== Early life ==
Wertz was born in Wilkes-Barre, Pennsylvania, in 1935. She left her hometown when she was 17 in order to train at the Pittsburgh Playhouse on a scholarship. One of her roommates was future film and television star Shirley Jones, also from Pennsylvania. Wertz subsequently undertook postgraduate studies at La Roche College, where her thesis was based on the series she created called The Chemical People.

== Career ==
Wertz first worked on local Pittsburgh TV delivering the weather report for WTAE-TV. It featured her singing to the audience while dressed in a negligee. She went on to host a popular children's morning program, Comedy Time, starting in 1958. The show was renamed Ricki & Copper the following year, when Ricki's dog, Copper, joined the cast. The show continued to be broadcast until 1969, when Wertz left the show to spend more time with her baby daughter who had been born prematurely.

From 1965 to 1982, Wertz also hosted Junior High Quiz on Sunday afternoons. Junior High Quiz showcased two teams of eighth grade students from local junior high schools. The students had to answer a series of questions to score points for their teams. The quiz show was sponsored by Pittsburgh National Bank. Both Ricki & Copper and Junior High Quiz were broadcast on WTAE-TV Channel 4.

Wertz moved to WQED-TV Channel 13 in 1982. There she hosted a documentary series, Chemical People, which focused on drug-addicted persons, and Project Literacy U.S., another documentary addressing literacy in the USA.

== Personal life ==
Wertz married Tom Bordenkircher in 1954. They met in Pittsburgh PA, while Ricki was acting at the Pittsburgh Playhouse and auditioned for a Coca-Cola commercial when Tom was working for an advertising agency. They remained married until his death in February 2020. She revealed in 2007 that Copper was the wedding gift Bordenkircher gave her, after she requested a dog instead of jewelry. Together, they had two children: Tom and Kristin. The couple moved from North Huntingdon to Chicago in 2015 to live closer to their children.

Wertz died on the night of July 14, 2021, at her home in Chicago. She was 86, and suffered from unspecified health issues prior to her death.
