= WPNT =

Television station in Pittsburgh

ATSC 3.0 station
- Pittsburgh, Pennsylvania; United States
- Channels: Digital: 21 (UHF); Virtual: 22
- Branding: 22 The Point

Programming
- Affiliations: 22.1: The CW (primary), MyNetworkTV (secondary); for others, see § Subchannels

Ownership
- Owner: Sinclair Broadcast Group; (WCWB Licensee, LLC)
- Sister stations: WPGH-TV

History
- Founded: December 2, 1974
- First air date: September 26, 1978 (Note: The Broadcasting and Cable Yearbook says September 26, while the Television and Cable Factbook says September 29.)
- Former call signs: WPTT-TV (1978–1998); WCWB (1998–2006); WPMY (2006–2015)
- Former channel numbers: Analog: 22 (UHF, 1978–2009); Digital: 42 (UHF, 1999–2019)
- Former affiliations: Independent (1978–1995); FNN (1981–1985); UPN (1995–1998); The WB (1998–2006); MyNetworkTV (primary, 2006–2023)
- Call sign meaning: "The Point"; convergence of the Ohio, Allegheny and Monongahela rivers

Technical information
- Licensing authority: FCC
- Facility ID: 73907
- ERP: 721 kW
- HAAT: 312 m (1,024 ft)
- Transmitter coordinates: 40°29′43″N 80°0′16″W

Links
- Public license information: Public file; LMS
- Website: 22thepoint.com

WPNT (channel 22), branded as 22 The Point, is a television station in Pittsburgh, Pennsylvania, United States, affiliated with The CW and MyNetworkTV. It is owned by Sinclair Broadcast Group alongside Fox affiliate WPGH-TV (channel 53). The two stations share studios on Ivory Avenue in the city's Summer Hill section, where WPNT's transmitter is also located.

== History ==
=== Early history of channel 22 ===
The channel 22 allocation dates back to the 1950s, and was initially acquired by public interest groups as a "backup" plan if the groups were not able to acquire the channel 13 allocation for public television. The groups were in a battle with locally based Westinghouse Electric Corporation (owners of KDKA radio), who wanted the channel 13 allocation for the proposed KDKA-TV. However, as Westinghouse later gave the groups permission to use channel 13 for what would become WQED (Westinghouse bought WDTV from struggling DuMont and transformed that station into KDKA-TV instead), WQED was now stuck with two TV licenses but found use in possibly using channel 22 for educational programs it did not have time to air.

WQED planned to use its proposed WQEX on channel 22, but WENS-TV (channel 16) lost its tower in Reserve Township in a storm on March 11, 1955, leading to a channel sharing agreement with WQED until the tower could be fixed. As WENS-TV was already in a battle for survival competing for the channel 11 license that it would ultimately lose, WQED was able to acquire WENS-TV's assets after that station signed off in 1957 and use its construction permit for channel 22 to relaunch WENS-TV as WQEX on channel 16 instead (that station is now WINP-TV). Its channel 22 license and some intellectual property from WENS-TV would eventually be sold to the Commercial Radio Institute (which later became Sinclair Broadcast Group) for the current channel 22, outbidding Cornerstone Television, who ended up with the channel 40 license to launch WPCB-TV.

=== WPTT-TV ===
Channel 22 signed on the air on September 26, 1978, as WPTT-TV (which stood for Pittsburgh Twenty-Two, referencing the channel on which it broadcast), the market's second commercial independent station and its fourth UHF station (after WPGH-TV). It started out running a number of popular off-network sitcoms from the 1950s and 1960s, off-network dramas and westerns, very old movies and network programming preempted by WTAE-TV (channel 4), KDKA-TV (channel 2) and WIIC-TV (channel 11, now WPXI). For a time, WPTT-TV aired the children's television program Captain Pitt, which featured older cartoon shorts.

WPTT-TV also originated more of its own local programming with Prize Bowling, which originally began as Bowling for Dollars on ABC network competitor WTAE-TV for many years until host Nick Perry was jailed for a lottery broadcast scam. The succeeding host was not received well by viewers, and the show ended up being canceled. WPTT-TV took the opportunity to fill the void in the market with Prize Bowling, first hosted by Pittsburgh radio legend Roger Willoughby-Ray and then by Pittsburgh Steelers announcer Jack Fleming. The show's success was modest at best, and was canceled after two years. Other programs of varying degrees of success were The Ghost Host, Eddie's Digest and Studio Wrestling.

The station also aired a newscast in the early 1980s, a rarity at this time for stations not affiliated with the then-major networks (ABC, CBS and NBC). This newscast was called WPTT News, and in the opening segment, the letters "news" were formed from a compass indicating the four cardinal directions. This opening segment, featuring then-anchorman Kevin Evans, appeared briefly (and was audible) in the movie Flashdance during a scene where Jennifer Beals' character returns home and turns on the television. The presentation was relatively low-budget, with the anchor simply reading copy, with no field video shots other than the weather read over a stock video shot denoting the conditions outside, and was not a factor in taking ratings away from then-market laggard WIIC-TV, much less solid runner-up WTAE-TV and then-locally-owned Group W powerhouse KDKA-TV. As sister stations WBFF in Baltimore did not air newscasts until 1991 and WTTE in Columbus, Ohio, would not air any newscasts from its 1984 sign-on until Sinclair purchased ABC affiliate WSYX in 1996, this marked Sinclair's first foray into local news, a genre it would become much more involved in from the mid-1990s on.

=== The 1980s and early 1990s ===
WPGH-TV, which had hitherto been a rather low-budget operation, was purchased by the Meredith Corporation in 1978, and became more aggressive with its programming strategy. Despite having a highly powerful signal that offered double the coverage of WPGH-TV's (5 million watts visual, compared to WPGH-TV's 2.345 million), WPTT-TV became unable to acquire newer shows, and ended up with programming that no other stations wanted. Still, the shows run on WPTT-TV were not exactly low-budget. The station's ratings were very low, and it was considered as an "also-ran" in the market. For many years, WPTT-TV languished as just another local independent station, airing reruns of television shows, many of which were past their prime. In 1986, Sinclair made an offer to buy WPGH-TV, combine programming assets onto channel 22, keep channel 22, and sell weaker signaled channel 53 to the Home Shopping Network (HSN), but were outbid by Lorimar-Telepictures. After that, WPTT-TV added some more recent shows, cartoons, and movies. By the late 1980s, both WPGH-TV, which was again sold, and WPTT-TV were losing money. WPTT-TV began running HSN programming nightly between 1 and 6 a.m.

In 1990, WPTT-TV and Pittsburgh's News Corporation (not affiliated with the News Corporation that owned Fox until 2013) entered into an agreement to produce a 10 p.m. newscast to air on WPTT-TV which was to begin in the summer of 1991, and would feature news anchors from WTAE-TV. After going through three owners, WPGH-TV was put up for sale again; Sinclair placed a bid for the station in 1991 and won; however, the group struggled to obtain financing. As part of a deal, the group sold WPTT-TV to its operations manager Eddie Edwards (who had been with WPTT-TV since its launch in 1978, and had become best known as host of the station's locally produced public affairs program Eddie's Digest, targeted towards local African Americans). Soon after, the planned newscast with WPTT-TV was put on hold with an option to either produce it for WPGH-TV, reinstate the plans with WPTT-TV, or cancel it; it was eventually canceled. WPTT-TV also made a deal to increase HSN programming hours to at least 15 hours a day with the option of running the programming the entire day. Rumors abounded that WPTT-TV would be running HSN programming for most of, if not the entire day, once the sale was completed. It was already established that some of WPTT-TV's first-run syndicated shows would go to WPGH-TV.

The sales closed on August 29, 1991, with Sinclair acquiring WPGH-TV from Renaissance Communications in the fall of that year. Rights to cash programming from WPTT-TV's schedule were moved to WPGH-TV, while barter shows were returned to syndication distributors (it was thought that WPTT-TV might wind up with some low-budget children's shows to run a couple hours a day). But Eddie Edwards acquired WPTT-TV without programming and began to run HSN programming 24 hours a day on WPTT-TV in September, which led to the station being dropped from the market's cable systems. Staffs from both WPGH-TV and WPTT-TV experienced layoffs. Some of WPTT-TV's ex-employees went to WPGH-TV while others stayed at WPTT-TV, and many others were laid off. WPGH-TV kept a decent number of its own staff, taking some from both stations. Edwards then made a deal with Sinclair to buy time on his station from 3 p.m. to midnight (effectively creating one of the first local marketing agreements, which Sinclair would use heavily in its later station acquisitions), and get area cable providers to reinstate WPTT-TV on their lineups.

The deal took effect on January 6, 1992, with WPTT-TV airing cartoons, sitcoms, movies and dramas that Sinclair had no room to air on WPGH-TV. Sinclair's air time on the station expanded in 1993 to begin at noon. In the fall of 1995, WPTT-TV began to run WPGH-TV programming from 6 a.m. to midnight and picked up The Disney Afternoon cartoon block, which had been dropped by KDKA-TV when that station began running CBS' entire lineup.

=== Network affiliation ===
==== UPN ====
WPTT-TV affiliated with UPN when the network launched on January 16, 1995, and changed its on-air branding to "UPN 22". Sinclair's air time on the station increased later that year to begin at 6 a.m. as well; by 1997, WPTT-TV and WPGH-TV consolidated their operations into one building.

==== The WB ====
WPTT-TV dropped its UPN affiliation on January 15, 1998 (which moved to WNPA-TV, channel 19) and affiliated with The WB as part of a wide-ranging affiliation deal that saw Sinclair Broadcast Group's owned and managed UPN affiliates and independent stations switch to the network. The station also changed its call sign to WCWB (for "C, or See, The WB") on January 13, two days before the switch, to reflect its new affiliation. The WCWB calls had previously been used by the NBC affiliate in Macon, Georgia (now WMGT-TV); the WPTT calls were later used by a radio station on 1360 AM in Pittsburgh, which later changed its callsign to WMNY in 2008. Prior to the Sinclair deal, WB programming was available to Pittsburgh on WNPA-TV and WBPA-LP (channel 29) and on cable systems via the superstation feed of WGN-TV in Chicago.

Sinclair finally bought back WCWB from Eddie Edwards in 2000, after the Federal Communications Commission (FCC) relaxed its media ownership rules to allow one company to own two television stations in the same market, provided the market has at least eight full-power stations and that one or both stations involved in the duopoly are not among the four highest-rated. WPGH-TV was the senior partner in the duopoly because of its Fox affiliation and because of its longer establishment.

WCWB aired the Action Pack programming block in 2000.

==== MyNetworkTV ====
On January 24, 2006, CBS Corporation and Time Warner announced that The WB and UPN would be shut down and replaced by The CW, a new network featuring programming from both networks. Through an affiliation agreement with 11 UPN affiliates owned by CBS, UPN owned-and-operated station WNPA was named the Pittsburgh affiliate of The CW, and later changed its call letters to WPCW.

WCWB, meanwhile, later decided to affiliate with MyNetworkTV, another new network owned by News Corporation's Fox Entertainment Group and 20th Television divisions. On April 17, WCWB changed its call letters to WPMY to reflect the new affiliation while keeping the "Pittsburgh's WB22" until the WB's end. On August 14, 2006, WPMY rebranded itself as MyPittsburghTV; the channel 22 reference was excluded from the new brand as cable providers in the market carry WPMY on different channels (the official brand name was "My Pittsburgh TV", although the logo had it appear to read as "My TV Pittsburgh"). The station withdrew from using their channel number in most promotional forms outside of sign-on/sign-off disclosures for FCC purposes, as the station instead used its Comcast channel 10 for advertising purposes with them and Armstrong Cable having the station in that slot; both systems cover the majority of the Pittsburgh market. Channel 22 officially joined MyNetworkTV when it launched on September 5, 2006. Unlike many other former WB affiliates switching to MyNetworkTV (and despite WNPA being CBS-owned), WPMY continued to air The WB's prime time schedule in the late night hours until September 18, 2006, when The CW launched.

=== WPNT ===
On May 19, 2015, WPMY quietly changed its call letters to WPNT for the landmark "Point" confluence of the Ohio, Allegheny and Monongahela rivers in downtown Pittsburgh, which previously appeared in the market nearly three decades earlier on FM 92.9, now WLTJ. Coincidentally, WLTJ also shares its transmitter facilities with WPGH-TV and WPNT.

On September 1, 2015, WPNT changed its on-air branding to 22 The Point (to further the branding, the station's logo utilized an exclamation point). WPNT began to focus more on local programming, particularly sports programming, including a weekly high school football package on Friday nights, while remaining a MyNetworkTV affiliate. No subchannels were planned at the time. As part of the changes, WPNT hired sports personality Mark Madden for a two-hour sports talk show every weeknight and continued to air games from the Pittsburgh Penguins' minor league affiliate, the Wilkes-Barre/Scranton Penguins, while adding the featured Pennsylvania State Athletic Conference Saturday game. Madden's program was cancelled on July 1, 2016.

On January 8, 2016, Sinclair announced that American Sports Network would launch as a dedicated, digital multicast network under the American Sports Network name with 10 stations including WPNT on January 11, 2016. However, the station continued to air Duquesne Dukes men's and women's basketball, Penn State Nittany Lions men's ice hockey, and the annual Arizona Bowl college football game on the main channel in addition to the ASN subfeed. ASN became Stadium in August 2017 and ceased syndication.

==== CW affiliation ====
On August 31, 2023, Nexstar Media Group, majority owners of The CW, announced that it extended its affiliation partnership with Sinclair Broadcast Group. As part of the deal, it was also announced that WPNT would be taking The CW affiliation effective September 1, with MyNetworkTV moving to late nights, following WPKD-TV becoming an independent. Prior to taking the affiliation full-time, WPNT had already served as a partial affiliate airing CW Sports programming rejected by CBS such as LIV Golf coverage.

== Subchannels ==
=== ATSC 1.0 subchannels ===
The station's ATSC 1.0 channels are carried on the multiplexed signals of two other Pittsburgh TV stations:

Subchannels provided by WPNT (ATSC 1.0)
Subchannel	Res.	Short name	Programming	ATSC 1.0 host
22.1	720p	WPNT CW	The CW (primary); MyNetworkTV (secondary)	WPGH-TV
22.2	480i	TheNest	The Nest	WTAE-TV
22.3	480i	Comet	Comet	WTAE-TV
22.4	480i	TBD	True Crime Network	WTAE-TV

Until the end of 2006, WPNT featured The Tube music video channel on a digital subchannel.

=== Analog-to-digital conversion ===
WPNT ended regular programming on its analog signal, over UHF channel 22, on February 17, 2009, the original target date on which full-power television stations in the United States were to transition from analog to digital broadcasts under federal mandate (the deadline was later extended to June 12). The station's digital signal continued to broadcast on its pre-transition UHF channel 42, using virtual channel 22. WPNT was one of three stations in the Pittsburgh market to discontinue normal programming on their analog signals on the original sign-off date, alongside sister station WPGH-TV and then-WQED-owned WQEX.

As part of the SAFER Act, WPNT and WPGH kept their analog signals on the air until March 19 to inform viewers of the digital television transition through a loop of public service announcements from the National Association of Broadcasters.

=== ATSC 3.0 lighthouse ===
Subchannels of WPNT (ATSC 3.0)
Subchannel	Short name	Programming
4.1	WTAE	ABC (WTAE-TV)
22.1	WPNT	The CW (primary); MyNetworkTV (secondary)
53.1	WPGH	Fox (WPGH-TV)
53.10	T2	T2
53.11	PBTV	Pickleballtv
53.20	GMLOOP	GameLoop
53.21	ROXi	ROXi

Subchannel broadcast with digital rights management
Subchannel streamed via the Internet

On June 16, 2020, WPNT discontinued ATSC 1.0 broadcasting and became one of the first stations in the country (and the first in the northeast United States) to begin broadcasting in ATSC 3.0. The ATSC 3.0 signal includes four unique channels which require an internet connection to access: T2, a FAST spinoff of Sinclair-owned Tennis Channel mapped at 53.10; PickleballTV, a sister channel to T2 focusing on pickleball mapped at 53.11; GameLoop, an interactive video game-focused channel that has playable versions of games such as Pac-Man and Tetris mapped at 53.20; and ROXi, an interactive music service mapped at 53.21.
