= Sally Wiggin =

American television reporter

- Born: Kalamazoo, Michigan, U.S.
- Education: University of Alabama; University of Michigan; University of Pittsburgh
- Occupation: Journalist
- Notable credit: WTAE-TV

Sarah Wiggin is an American television news anchor and personality in Pittsburgh.

== Early life and education ==
Sally Wiggin was born in Kalamazoo, Michigan, to Chadwick and Margaret Wiggin. Wiggin and her family moved to Florence, Alabama, when she was six years old. She attended Emory University for a year before transferring to the University of Alabama, where she studied East Asian history and graduated Phi Beta Kappa. She earned a master's degree in Asian Studies from the University of Michigan and studied Japanese at the University of Pittsburgh.

== Career ==
Wiggin first worked for (then ABC affiliate) WBRC-TV (now a Fox affiliate) in Birmingham, Alabama, where she won Alabama Associated Press Award in 1980 for her feature series "Is Your Marriage on the Rocks?" She also worked as WSGN radio in Birmingham, Alabama, where she shared an RTNDA Edward R. Murrow Award, National Headliners Award, and National Sigma Delta Chi Award for her part in an investigative report on insurance fraud in 1977.

In 1980, Wiggin turned down a news anchor job in Atlanta in order to join WTAE-TV in Pittsburgh. She then became co-anchor of the weekend news at WTAE-TV in 1981. In November 1986, she was named anchor for the weeknight news. In that position, she was part of a successful team with Don Cannon. In 1987, she won the United Press International Best Special Award for her work on The Budd Dwyer Special about Pennsylvania State Treasurer R. Budd Dwyer's on-air suicide.

Wiggin became a host for the Pittsburgh Steelers pre-game shows in 1993 and continued until December 2017. She also makes regular guest appearances on WDVE morning comedy show. Wiggin's role with WTAE shifted in 2004 when she left the 11 pm news and joined the noon news. She left the 6 pm news in 2008, but did special reports and in-depth interviews for the station. On June 21, 2013, WTAE announced that Wiggin would host "Chronicle" and would step down as the anchor of the Noon broadcast. In 2015, she was part of a team that received a Peabody Award. On November 30, 2018, she retired from WTAE. Her only marriage, to a minor league baseball player, ended in divorce.

== Community service ==
In 1998 and 1999, Wiggin served on the board of directors of the Women's Center & Shelter of Greater Pittsburgh, one of the first six centers for domestic violence response and prevention that was established in the United States.

Wiggin also served on the boards of the Caring Foundation, Pittsburgh's Parental Stress Center, the Pittsburgh Symphony Orchestra, and the Pittsburgh Zoo & Aquarium, and has also helped to provide support to, and raise funds for, the Greater Pittsburgh Community Food Bank for over a decade.

In 2022, Wiggin was appointed to the board of directors of the Urban League of Greater Pittsburgh."
