= Wilkinsburg shooting =

Wilkinsburg shooting may refer to:

- 2000 Wilkinsburg shooting, a racially motivated shooting spree that left three people dead and two injured
- 2016 Wilkinsburg shooting, a mass shooting that left six people dead and three injured
