= Yvonne Campos =

R. Yvonne Campos, is the founding CEO of market research and strategy firm, Campos Inc, a nationally recognized focus group moderator, facilitator and consultant. Under her leadership, Campos Inc, founded in 1986, became the premier research company in the Pittsburgh market by introducing new and innovative research techniques and consumer trend analysis. She is the founder of two Pittsburgh chapters of the Women Presidents’ Organization, a peer-to-peer learning model for women-owned businesses with revenues over one million dollars.

R. Yvonne Campos, a native of Austin, Texas, moved to Pittsburgh in the late ’70s to work for MARC Research and Analysis Corp. After many years doing this work, in 1986 she opened Campos, Inc., which originally started as a qualitative company that conducted focus groups during its first official shift. The company evolved into a full-service market research organization, offering both qualitative and quantitative services.

Campos is extremely involved in the Pittsburgh area including sitting on several boards. Her positions include serving as the Chairman of Goodwill Of Southwestern Pennsylvania since April 2013. She serves as Vice Chairman at WQED Multimedia. Ms. Campos serves as a Director of Highmark Blue Cross Blue Shield (Highmark Inc), and in the past, and has served as a Director of Pittsburgh Financial Corp. since 2001.

Campos is also one of the founders of the Next Act Fund. Next Act Fund is an opportunity for women to be involved in the angel investment community with other like-minded women. As a part of Next Act, women are given a seat at the table where the economic growth of the Pittsburgh region is decided, and at the same time heighten the impact of women-owned /led businesses. Next Act Fund works together to create opportunities and jobs for others.

== Bibliography ==
- Pennsylvania Commission on Women (2006). Voices : African American and Latina women share their stories of success. Newtown Square, PA: Harrowood Books. ISBN 978-0915180394.
