= WBPA-LD =

Television station in Pittsburgh

Translator of WQED

Pittsburgh, Pennsylvania; United States
- Channels: Digital: 12 (VHF); Virtual: 13

Programming
- Affiliations: 13.1: PBS; for others, see § Subchannels

Ownership
- Owner: Venture Technologies Group, LLC
- Operator: WQED Multimedia

History
- Founded: January 14, 1988
- First air date: September 28, 1989
- Former call signs: W29AH (1989–June 1995); WTWB-LP (June-December 1995); WBPA-LP (December 1995–2020)
- Former channel numbers: Analog: 29 (UHF, 1989–2004), 30 (UHF, 2005–2019)
- Former affiliations: Video Jukebox Network (1989–1995); The WB (1995–1997); Independent (1997–1998, c. 2006–??); UPN (1998–c. 2006); Rev'n (??–2025)
- Call sign meaning: "WB Pennsylvania" (from stint as WB affiliate)

Technical information
- Licensing authority: FCC
- Facility ID: 10185
- Class: LD
- ERP: 3 kW
- HAAT: 169.3 m (555 ft)
- Transmitter coordinates: 40°26′46.2″N 79°57′50.2″W

Links
- Public license information: LMS
- Website: www.wqed.org

WBPA-LD (channel 12) is a low-power television station in Pittsburgh, Pennsylvania, United States, owned by Venture Technologies Group. Since 2025, it has operated as a translator of PBS member station WQED (channel 13).

== History ==
On January 14, 1988, the Federal Communications Commission (FCC) granted a construction permit to Channel 29 Associates of Calabasas, California—owned by Venture founder Lawrence Rogow—for a new low-power TV station on channel 29 at Pittsburgh, W29AH. The station began test broadcasts on September 28, 1989, airing programming from the Video Jukebox Network.

After five years of running music videos, channel 29 found a new calling in January 1995, when The WB launched. W29AH was intended to serve as one half of a simulcast with Johnstown's WTWB-TV channel 19, filling the largest missing market gap for the new network. W29AH became WTWB-LP on June 1, 1995, and WBPA-LP on December 15. Channels 19 and 29 became the new UPN affiliate in 1998 when that network's former outlet, WPTT channel 22, switched to The WB (with WTWB-TV becoming WNPA); they briefly were independents due to lawsuits surrounding that station's change.

Venture sold channel 19 to the Paramount Stations Group late in 1998, making it a network owned-and-operated station and splitting it from WBPA-LP. For several months, the two continued simulcasting. In the early 2000s, WBPA-LP moved to channel 30.

In 2012, Venture sought to build digital facilities for WBPA-LP on channel 6, utilizing hybrid analog-digital technology to turn it into a "Franken-FM" station with audio on 87.7 MHz. The FCC denied this proposal on technical grounds with the standard that the company proposed for WBPA and a station in Lubbock, Texas.

WBPA-LP was displaced during the repack by Class A station WPTG-CD and applied to move to channel 12 and convert to digital. The station went silent to allow WPTG-CD to move in 2019, but delays from the COVID-19 pandemic, the availability of transmitter installers, and a contracted electrician's foot operation set the reconstruction of WBPA back enough that Venture had to apply for a waiver to avoid automatic license cancellation. The facility was completed in late October, when a license to cover was filed.

On October 23, 2025, it was announced that PBS member station WQED (channel 13) would start simulcasting its programming on WBPA-LD. Both WQED and WBPA-LD share the same transmitting tower. The same digital channels that are available on WQED's main frequency are also carried on WBPA-LD.

== Subchannels ==
Subchannels of WQED and WBPA-LD
Channel	Res.	Aspect	Short name	Programming
13.1	1080i	16:9	WQED-HD	PBS
13.2	480i	16:9	CREATE	Create
13.3	480i	16:9	WORLD	World
13.4	480i	16:9	SHOW	Showcase
13.5	480i	16:9	KIDS	PBS Kids
