= 1980 Pennsylvania Lottery scandal =

Lottery rigging scandal

Screenshot from a video of the drawing, showing three containers each with 10 ping pong balls, just before the balls were released to be scrambled and then selected

The 1980 Pennsylvania Lottery scandal, colloquially known as the Triple Six Fix, was a successful plot to rig The Daily Number, a three-digit game of the Pennsylvania Lottery. All of the balls in the three machines, except those numbered 4 and 6, were weighted, meaning that the drawing was almost sure to be a combination of those digits. The scheme was successful in that 666 (one of the eight combinations of 4s and 6s that the "fixers" were hoping for) was drawn on April 24, 1980; however, the unusual betting patterns alerted authorities to the crime. The chief conspirators were sent to prison, and most of the fraudulently acquired winnings were never paid out.

== Planning ==
The plan was masterminded by Nick Perry (1916–2003), The Daily Number's announcer. Perry was born Nicholas Pericles Katsafanas in the Morningside neighborhood of Pittsburgh, Pennsylvania. He attended Peabody High School and Duquesne University in Pittsburgh. After serving in the U.S. Navy in World War II, Perry began a career as a radio broadcaster in Charleston, West Virginia, then entered television broadcasting on Pittsburgh's WDTV, the forerunner of KDKA-TV. Perry later moved over to rival WTAE-TV in 1958, as a staff announcer. Later, he became a news and weather reporter and was the host of local sports shows like Bowling for Dollars and Championship Bowling. In 1977, Perry became the host of the live nightly broadcast of the Pennsylvania Lottery, held in the studios of WTAE.

Perry first discussed his idea with Jack and Peter Maragos, two of his partners in a vending machine business. Once committed to the plan, Perry approached local Pittsburgh lettering expert and WTAE art director Joseph Bock about creating weighted ping-pong balls that were replicas of the official balls used in the lottery machines. The No. 4 and No. 6 balls were chosen as the lucky lighter balls.

Perry got access to the machines and ping-pong balls, which had been kept in a room at WTAE studios, through Edward Plevel, a lottery official. The room was locked with two keys; Perry had one, and Plevel had the other. Plevel left the machines and balls unguarded for several minutes on a few occasions. Perry also got WTAE stagehand Fred Luman to physically switch the original balls with the weighted ones twice: once before and once after the drawing. Bock then took the rigged balls back to his studio and burned them in a paint can a half-hour after the on-air drawing was done.

== Drawing ==
Perry was the host of The Daily Number on April 24, 1980, when the drawing produced the number "666" for a then-record payout of $3.5 million (equivalent to $13.68 million in 2025), including $1.18 million (equivalent to $4.61 million in 2025) that went to eight people in on the scam.

Lottery authorities and local bookmakers became suspicious when they noticed that a large number of tickets were purchased for the eight possible combinations, and a handful of players came forward to claim the prize.

On the date of the drawing, the Maragos brothers traveled around Pennsylvania buying large quantities of tickets containing the eight possible numbers. The investigation was broken open when an anonymous tip led to a bar near Philadelphia where the brothers had bought a large number of lottery tickets. An employee remembered the brothers coming into the bar with a platinum-blonde woman and laying down a large amount of cash to buy lottery tickets, all on the eight specific numbers. The employee recalled that while he printed the tickets, one of the brothers made a pay phone call, spoke in a foreign language, and held up the phone so the listener could hear the lottery machine printing the tickets.

Investigators pulled the phone records and traced the call to the WTAE-TV announcer's booth in the studio where the drawing was done. This strongly implicated Perry, and Maragos confirmed under questioning that the conversation had been with Perry (in Greek). Further investigation and questioning of the Maragos brothers eventually implicated the rest of the conspirators. William Moran of Fairmont, West Virginia, organized the out-of-state buying of additional lottery tickets for a numbers-running scam.

It was later revealed that the Maragos brothers also placed bets on the eight numbers with local bookmakers who had illegal numbers games that used the lottery drawing as the winning result. The brothers also told friends and family which numbers to play. All of this may have contributed to the conspiracy's downfall, with the greater influx of slanted bets.

== Aftermath ==
A grand jury was assembled and charges were leveled against all seven men. Plevel was convicted and spent two years in prison. Bock, Luman, and Moran pleaded guilty in exchange for lighter sentences. The Maragos brothers avoided jail time by agreeing to testify against Perry. Much of the $1.8 million ($7.03 million today) was recovered from the Maragos brothers, as were numerous lottery tickets.

Perry was convicted of criminal conspiracy, criminal mischief, theft by deception, rigging a publicly exhibited contest and perjury on May 20, 1981. He was sentenced to seven years in prison. He served two years at State Correctional Institution – Camp Hill and spent another year at a halfway house in the East Liberty section of Pittsburgh, Pennsylvania. Perry remained on parole until March 1989. He held a number of jobs after prison including an unsuccessful attempt to return to broadcasting in the late 1980s. Perry died in Attleboro, Massachusetts, on April 22, 2003, having never admitted to any role in the plot.

After the scandal, the Pennsylvania Lottery and other drawings began taking greater precautions to guard against rigging. The drawings for the Lottery were moved from WTAE to WHP-TV in the state capital of Harrisburg on June 29, 1981, on orders of Governor Dick Thornburgh who made the announcement on June 10, 1981, along with the addition of a "security chief" and background checks on all staff related to the drawings. The Pittsburgh market broadcasting rights were given to KDKA-TV in 1981 as well. In Harrisburg, despite the drawings now being held at PBS affiliate WITF-TV, they air locally on rival station WGAL, which has been a sister station to WTAE since it was acquired by Hearst from Pulitzer in 1999. It was not until July 1, 2009, that the Lottery resumed airing on WTAE, where the drawings remained until July 1, 2015, when WPXI took over.

=== In popular culture ===
The 2000 film Lucky Numbers, starring John Travolta and Lisa Kudrow, was loosely based on Perry's story.

In 2006, Game Show Network aired a documentary in their Anything to Win series about the scandal, complete with anecdotes from former WTAE and KDKA news anchor Don Cannon. The 2013 episode "The Good, the Bad, & the Baby" from Castle's sixth season is loosely based on the scandal. In 2011, a season 2 episode of Mysteries at the Museum briefly features the story.

Case photographs, artifacts, and information can be viewed at the Pennsylvania State Police Museum in Hershey, Pennsylvania.

== See also ==
- Hot Lotto fraud scandal
- 666 (number)
