= Debra Fox =

American journalist

- Born: Gloversville, NY
- Education: University of Iowa
- Occupation: President/CEO Fox Learning Systems
- Notable credit: WTAE-TV Anchor 1976 - 1986
- Spouse(s): Jules Rosen, M.D.
- Website: http://www.foxlearningsystems.com

Debra Fox is the founder and CEO of Fox Learning Systems. She was previously a television reporter and anchor with WTAE-TV Pittsburgh (1976–1986).

== WTAE television career ==
Fox was named "Best Pittsburgh Newscaster" seven years in a row by the Pittsburgh Tribune Review. During her ten-year television career, she was able to interview many prominent national figures such as Presidents Gerald Ford, Jimmy Carter (during the Iran Hostage Crisis), Ronald Reagan, George H. W. Bush, Governor Michael Dukakis, Senator Ted Kennedy, Senator Joe Biden, Reverend Jesse Jackson, Walter Mondale and Gary Hart. She also covered the 1984 Democratic National Convention in San Francisco. After having her first child in 1986, she retired from WTAE.

== The Golden Land ==
In 1990, Fox took over for Wolf Blitzer in PBS's series "The Golden Land". This was a documentary about the history of Israel in the context of the Israeli-Palestinian Conflict

== Fox Learning Systems ==
In 1997, Debra founded Fox Learning Systems after personally experiencing problems in the long-term care industry. Using her on-camera experiences, Fox set out to produce software and educational material that makes eldercare staff training enjoyable. Fox has started her own blog that talks about the many troubles dealing with the elder care industry

== Notable appearances ==
- 2009: Seton Hill E-Magnify "Build A World-Class Business" Conference, Keynote Speaker
- 2008: Rite Aid and Fox Learning Systems team up together to launch Rite Aid “Giving Care For Parents” using Fox’s educational video training
- 2008: Pittsburgh magazine featured article on Debra Fox Improving Eldercare through Education
- 2004: Feature article in E-Magnify a Seton Hill publication
- 2003: Keynote speaker for National Women’s Leadership conference held in Pittsburgh
- 2002: Speaker at the MIT forum, Pittsburgh chapter
- 2000: Feature Article in the Pittsburgh Post-Gazette speaking about the focus of Fox Learning Systems.
- 1991: Acted as a television news reporter in the TV Movie The 10 Million Dollar Getaway

== Awards ==
- 2007: Acceptance and successful completion of the National Institutes of Health Commercialization Assistance Program
- 2006: National Winner of the American Association of Geriatric Psychiatry's Images of Aging Communications Award
- 2005: Inducted into the National Association of Women’s Presidents Organization
- 2004: Winner of the 50 Best Women in Business Award for Pennsylvania
