= CQED =

CQED may refer to:

- Cavity quantum electrodynamics (CQED)
- Circuit quantum electrodynamics (cQED)

== See also ==
- QED (disambiguation)
