= Joe Negri =

American jazz guitarist and educator (1926–2026)

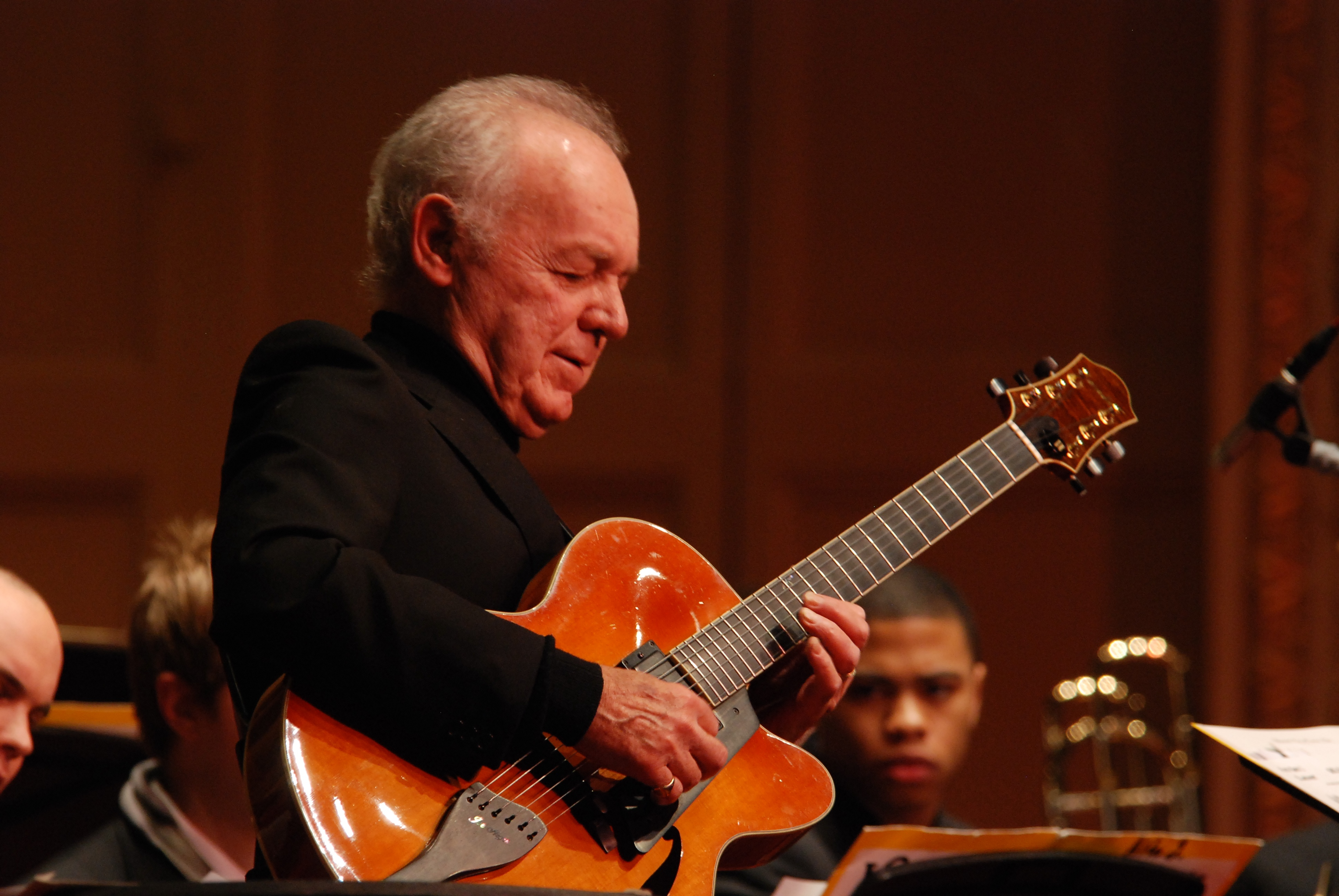
- Negri performing in 2007

Background information
- Born: Joseph Harold Negri; June 10, 1926; Pittsburgh, Pennsylvania, U.S.
- Died: May 30, 2026 (aged 99) Scott Township, Pennsylvania, U.S.
- Genres: Jazz
- Occupations: Musician; educator; actor
- Instrument: Guitar
- Years active: 1929–2026

Joseph Harold Negri (June 10, 1926 – May 30, 2026) was an American jazz guitarist and educator. He appeared as himself and as "Handyman Negri" in the Neighborhood of Make-Believe segments on Mister Rogers' Neighborhood. He appeared on the 1958 children's television program Adventure Time with Paul Shannon and with Johnny Costa on the 1954 TV series 67 Melody Lane hosted by Ken Griffin.

Negri taught jazz guitar for 49 years at the University of Pittsburgh, where jazz guitar was first offered as a discipline in higher education. He taught for 46 years at Duquesne University, as well as at Carnegie Mellon University.

== Life and career ==
At the age of three, Negri began performing on radio, playing the ukulele and singing. He joined the local musicians' union and began playing professional engagements. In the 1940s, he toured nationally and was a member of the Shep Fields and His Rippling Rhythm Orchestra from 1943 until 1944, when he served in the U.S. Army for two years.

After returning home, he performed in Pittsburgh with his brother, pianist Bobby Negri. In the 1950s, he enrolled at Carnegie Mellon University, concentrated on music composition, spent the majority of his time playing locally around the Pittsburgh area and often worked with pianist Johnny Costa on KDKA television. His trio, with accordionist Dom Trimarkie and bassist Lou Mauro, were the regular band on the live KDKA variety show Buzz and Bill, hosted by the team of Buzz Aston and Bill Hinds. Around 1960, WTAE, Pittsburgh's ABC television outlet, hired him as its music director, assuming the role for over 20 years. Negri played on various live programs and composed theme music. He met Fred Rogers at WTAE, when Rogers hosted a short-lived children's show. In 1968, Negri began appearing as Handyman Negri on the children's program Mister Rogers' Neighborhood until Rogers ceased production of new episodes in 2000. Though many assume Negri was part of the musical ensemble on the show, in fact he only occasionally joined the show's band on special occasions. Most of his work on the program involved his Handyman Negri character or portraying himself as owner of "Negri's Music Shop" when Rogers presented musical guests.

Negri taught guitar and later helped Duquesne University establish a jazz guitar program. Over the years he taught many students including Ralph Patt, the inventor of major-thirds tuning. Negri and Patt recorded together in 1989.

In 2010 he recorded the album Fly Me to the Moon with Michael Feinstein and performed with him during the following year at the Newport Jazz Festival. Negri was the subject of a profile in the September 2010 issue of Vintage Guitar magazine written by Rich Kienzle.

Joe Negri died in Scott Township, Pennsylvania on May 30, 2026, at the age of 99, 11 days before his 100th birthday.

== Joe Negri archives ==
The Joe Negri archives consist of the collection of manuscripts, recordings, memorabilia, and original hand-written scores that document his life, work, and influence. The collection was donated by Negri in 1999 to the Center for American Music within the University Library System (ULS) at the University of Pittsburgh. The donation became the 1,000th collection at the ULS to have an electronically accessible finding aid (i.e., a guide that describes the contents of an archival collection and creator). The archives contains correspondence, commissioned commercial musical compositions, scores, recordings, and television archival footage. His donation also included his college coursework, compositions written for the River City Brass Band, television scores, commercial jingles, and film work. Companies that commissioned work from Negri included McDonald's, Alcoa, Kaufmann's, and Westinghouse.

== Discography ==
=== As leader ===
- Guitar, With Love (True Image Recordings, 1960)
- Afternoon in Rio (MCG Jazz, 1998)
- Guitars for Christmas (MCG Jazz, 2003)
- Uptown Elegance (MCG Jazz, 2004) with Buddy DeFranco
- Dream Dancing (Noteworthy Jazz, 2010)

=== As sideman ===
- Michael Feinstein, Fly Me to the Moon (DuckHole, 2010)

== Other works ==
- A Common Sense Approach to Improvisation for Guitar (Mel Bay, 2002)
