= Fly Me to the Moon (Michael Feinstein album) =

Studio album by Michael Feinstein
- Released: 2010
- Studios: Nola Recording Studios, New York, NY
- Genre: Jazz
- Length: 1:00:51
- Label: DuckHole
- Producers: Paul Andre; Michael Feinstein

Michael Feinstein chronology
The Power of Two (2009)	Fly Me to the Moon (2010)	Cheek to Cheek: Cook and Feinstein (2011)

Fly Me to the Moon is an album by Michael Feinstein, featuring guitarist Joe Negri, released in 2010 through DuckHole Records, consisting of covers and jazz standards. The album reached a peak position of number 39 on Billboard's Jazz Albums chart.

== Track listing ==
No.	Title	Writer(s)	Length
1.	"So in Love"	Cole Porter	4:38
2.	"Meditation"	Norman Gimbel, Antônio Carlos Jobim, Newton Mendonça	5:46
3.	"Fly Me to the Moon"	Bart Howard	4:42
4.	"I Wish I Knew"	Mack Gordon / Harry Warren	3:43
5.	"Blame My Absent Minded Heart"	Sammy Cahn, Jule Styne	4:24
6.	"A Mist Is Over the Moon"	Oscar Hammerstein II, Ben Oakland	4:38
7.	"Serenata"	Leroy Anderson, Mitchell Parish	2:35
8.	"Why Shouldn't I"	Cole Porter	5:24
9.	"One Love in My Life"	Murray Grand, Harry Warren	4:17
10.	"This Time the Dream's on Me"	Harold Arlen, Johnny Mercer	3:11
11.	"A Man and His Dream"	Johnny Burke, James V. Monaco	5:00
12.	"While My Lady Sleeps"	Gus Kahn, Bronislaw Kaper	4:02
13.	"Lonely Town"	Leonard Bernstein, Betty Comden, Adolph Green	3:48
14.	"It Could Happen to You"	Johnny Burke, James Van Heusen	4:43
Total length:			1:00:51

== Personnel ==
Musicians

- Michael Feinstein - Vocals
- Joe Negri - Guitar
- Jay Leonhart - Bass
- Joe Cocuzzo - Drums

Technical

- Paul Andre - Producer
- Jim Czak - Engineer
- David Glasser - Mastering
- Bill Moss - Engineer
