= Brett McCutcheon =

American music composer and educator

Brett McCutcheon is an American composer, multi-instrumentalist, and music educator known for co-producing the music for the documentary The Ocean – Five Years.

== Early life and education ==
McCutcheon grew up in the Pittsburgh area and attended North Allegheny High School. He later studied music education at Slippery Rock University of Pennsylvania, graduating with a bachelor's degree in music education in 2024.

McCutcheon began playing piano at the age of four while living in Prague. He later became a saxophonist and percussionist and participated in marching bands and musical ensembles.

== Music career ==
McCutcheon is a multi-instrumentalist, composer, arranger, producer, and recording artist. Before becoming a full-time music educator, he worked with The Vault Recording Studio in Pittsburgh as an assistant engineer and social media manager.

McCutcheon's work has included composition, orchestration, music production, and performance. He has collaborated with musician June Bracken on original music combining classical orchestration and pop music.

== The Ocean – Five Years ==
Following the death of his older brother Ryan McCutcheon in a 2017 automobile accident, McCutcheon began using music as a means of processing his grief. Over a period of several years, he composed a five-track EP titled The Ocean – Five Years.

The music became the basis for the 2024 documentary film The Ocean – Five Years, directed by Jennifer Schlieper and produced by Flying Scooter Productions. The documentary follows McCutcheon and his family and incorporates his original music, personal video diaries, interviews, and performances by musicians from the Pittsburgh Symphony Orchestra.

The film was selected for the Three Rivers Film Festival in Pittsburgh and won the Best Documentary award at the Vienna Independent Film Festival.

At the Pittsburgh premiere, McCutcheon's compositions were performed by musicians from the Pittsburgh Symphony Orchestra alongside the Mt. Lebanon High School Wind Ensemble and singer Chris Jamison.

In 2026, McCutcheon and The Ocean - Five Years won a Mid-Atlantic regional Emmy in the documentary category.

== Music education ==
After graduating from Slippery Rock University, McCutcheon began his career as a music educator and became a band instructor at Mt. Lebanon High School. He has worked with the school's marching and concert-band programs and has also been involved in music technology and production education.
