= KQED =

KQED may refer to:

- KQED (TV), a PBS member station in San Francisco
- KQED-FM, an NPR member station in San Francisco
- KQED Inc., the parent organization of KQED (TV) and KQED-FM

== See also ==
- WQED (disambiguation)
- QED (disambiguation)
