= Don Cannon (news anchor) =

American journalist (born 1940)

- Born: Donald James Clark; February 22, 1940 (age 86)
- Occupation: News anchor
- Notable credits: WTAE-TV; KDKA-TV KYW-TV

Don Cannon (born Donald James Clark; February 22, 1940) is an American retired television news reporter, best known as a local news anchorman on Pittsburgh, Pennsylvania-area television.

== Biography ==
Cannon worked at WTAE-TV from 1969 to 1994. During that time, he became a "fixture of Pittsburgh broadcasting" as part of the WTAE news team, along with Paul Long and meteorologist Joe DeNardo. In later years, he was teamed with Sally Wiggin. In 1999, he returned to Pittsburgh and worked for KDKA-TV, after having worked for KDKA's sister station, KYW-TV in Philadelphia from 1995 to 1998 (while there, he was credited as Don Clark, as a radio personality in the city was also named Don Cannon). He left that position in 2007.

Cannon has "a public history of battling depression and alcoholism." In 2009, he was arrested in California for failure to report for sentencing in two separate cases of driving under the influence dating back to 2007. After then being returned to the Pittsburgh area, in April 2010 he was jailed for violating a no-drinking clause in his probation.
