= Lucky Numbers =

- Theatrical release poster
- Directed by: Nora Ephron
- Written by: Adam Resnick
- Produced by: Sean Daniel; Nora Ephron; Jonathan D. Krane; Andrew Lazar
- Starring: John Travolta; Lisa Kudrow; Tim Roth; Ed O'Neill; Michael Rapaport; Bill Pullman
- Cinematography: John Lindley
- Edited by: Barry Malkin
- Music by: George Fenton
- Production companies: StudioCanal; Mad Chance; Alphaville
- Distributed by: Paramount Pictures (International); BAC Films (France); StudioCanal (Europe and Africa)
- Release date: October 27, 2000
- Running time: 105 minutes
- Countries: United States; France
- Language: English
- Budget: $63 million
- Box office: $10.9 million

Lucky Numbers is a 2000 black comedy film directed by Nora Ephron and starring John Travolta, Lisa Kudrow, Tim Roth, Ed O'Neill, Michael Rapaport, Richard Schiff, Daryl Mitchell, Bill Pullman, and Michael Moore. The screenplay by Adam Resnick was inspired by the 1980 Pennsylvania Lottery scandal. It is the only film Ephron directed without also writing the screenplay.

Lucky Numbers was released on October 27, 2000 by Paramount Pictures in international markets, BAC Films in France and StudioCanal in Europe and Africa. The film received negative reviews and was a box-office bomb, grossing $10.9 million against a $63 million budget.

== Plot ==
Russ Richards, the weatherman for a Harrisburg, Pennsylvania, television station, is revered as a local celebrity by his viewers, and fame affords him such perks as a reserved parking spot and his own booth at Denny's, where an omelet bears his name. His eternally optimistic demeanor conceals the fact his snowmobile dealership is on the verge of bankruptcy due to an unusually warm winter.

His friend Gig, a shady strip club owner, suggests an insurance scam will free Russ of his financial problems, but when the scheme fails to pay off, Russ finds himself even deeper in debt and the target of a hitman named Dale. Gig then proposes Russ rig the Pennsylvania Lottery with the help of his amoral girlfriend Crystal Latroy, a ditzy model who pulls and announces the winning numbers on television, and her oddball cousin Walter, who will pose as the owner of the lucky ticket.

Their plan works, but before the $6.4 million jackpot can be claimed, everything begins to unravel. First, Walter gets greedy, refuses to hand the winning ticket over to his cousin and Crystal's physical confrontation triggers Walter's ultimately fatal asthma attack. Sleazy station manager Dick Simmons, who also is sleeping with Crystal, tries to blackmail her and Russ when he discovers what they have done, and others who have uncovered what appears to be the worst kept secret in town demand their share as well.

Mayhem and murder ensue, prompting lazy detectives Lakewood and Chambers to initiate an investigation they hope will not be too taxing. Russ decides to sell the ticket to Dick for $100,000 to get clear of the debt he owes to Dale. Crystal is irate, and she immediately seduces Dick to get back into her share of the winnings. Dale breaks into Dick's house and tries to rob the ticket from him, but the police arrive, and Lakewood ends up killing him.

On his way home, Lakewood comes across Russ who has jackknifed and overturned an 18-wheeler as he tries to unload his snowmobile inventory on another dealer. Fearing Lakewood has come to arrest him, Russ flees with his $100,000 on a snowmobile but crashes into a tree. At the hospital, Lakewood gives him a ticket for operating the snowmobile without a license and explains what happened to Dick and Dale. Russ goes to Dick's hospital room and steals the lottery ticket back. He gives it to Wendy (the waitress from Denny's) and moves to Florida where he becomes a successful host of a gameshow called "Lucky Numbers."

== Cast ==
- John Travolta as Russ Richards
- Lisa Kudrow as Crystal Latroy
- Tim Roth as Gig
- Ed O'Neill as Dick Simmons
- Michael Rapaport as Dale
- Daryl Mitchell as Detective Chambers
- Bill Pullman as Detective Pat Lakewood
- Richard Schiff as Jerry Green
- Michael Moore as Walter
- Michael Weston as Larry
- Sam McMurray as Chief Troutman
- Caroline Aaron as Nurse Sharpling
- Maria Bamford as Wendy Fawcett
- John F. O'Donohue as Bobby
- Colin Mochrie as Jack
- Nick Loren as Father
- Jake Fritz as Sam
- Emmy Laybourne as Process saver
- Ken Jenkins as Dan Schuff

== Soundtrack ==
Lucky Numbers

Soundtrack album by Various Artists
- Released: October 24, 2000
- Recorded: Various
- Genre: Pop
- Label: Atlantic Records
- Producer: George Fenton

Track listing

1. "Light of Day" – Joan Jett and the Blackhearts
2. "Obsession" – Animotion
3. "Right Place, Wrong Time" – Dr. John
4. "Easy Money" – Rickie Lee Jones
5. "Heaven's on Fire" – Kiss
6. "Rapture" – Blondie
7. "Freeze-Frame" – The J. Geils Band
8. "Love Is the Drug" – Grace Jones
9. "We Are the Champions" – Queen
10. "My Way" – Jimmy Roselli
11. "My Big Reward" – Joan Jett and the Blackhearts
12. "Lucky Numbers" – George Fenton
13. "Brave Strangers" – Bob Seger & The Silver Bullet Band
14. "Moving in Stereo" – The Cars

== Release ==
=== Box office ===
The film, based on a $63 million budget, only grossed $10,890,222.

=== Critical reception ===
Lucky Numbers earned negative reviews from critics. On Rotten Tomatoes, it has a rating of 23% based on 97 reviews. The site's consensus states: "Nora Ephron's attempt at dark comedy is an uneven product, both in terms of the direction and the acting. The characters are unlikable to the point where you don't care what happens to them, and Ephron condescends to the material." On Metacritic, it has a score of 31 out of 100 based on reviews from 30 critics, indicating "generally unfavorable" reviews. Audiences surveyed by CinemaScore gave the film a grade F. It was the third film released in October 2000 to receive the grade, after Dr. T & the Women and Lost Souls, and the fourth overall film released in 2000 to receive the grade, after Eye of the Beholder which was released earlier that same year.

Roger Ebert of the Chicago Sun-Times noted the film "tells too much story at not enough energy. It should have been cut back and cranked up. Instead, it keeps introducing new characters until the plot becomes a juggling act just when it should be a sprint. And there's another problem: Is it intended as a comedy, or not? I ask because there are funny things in it, and then gruesome things, sad things and brutal things. Quentin Tarantino was able to cover that spread in Pulp Fiction. But Nora Ephron [...] doesn't find a way [...] So much depends on tone in a movie. Either you find the right one and stick with it, or you're in trouble (unless, like Tarantino, you really know what you're doing). If we're supposed to like these people, then there's a point beyond which they should not go in their villainy. If we're not, then the scenes where they're nice should have more irony [...] By the end of the film, we're less entertained than relieved. Lots of stuff happened, and much of it might have been interesting in a different kind of film. Here we got the curious sense that the characters are racing around Harrisburg breathlessly trying to keep up with the plot."

Mick LaSalle of the San Francisco Chronicle observed, "As both a writer and a director, Ephron has specialized in sentiment mixed with wiseguy banter — a combination that sometimes works but just as often succeeds only in being both cloying and irritating. In Lucky Numbers [...] [Ephron] is suddenly liberated, and she guides her talented cast toward performances that are playful and yet comically precise [...] It's a bit of fluff that, all the same, is a gentle commentary on human nature [...] Mainly it's just a showcase for a lot of gifted comic actors to show their stuff — and for Travolta to go from complacency to wide-eyed panic, hitting all points in between."

Michael O'Sullivan of The Washington Post said, "Although Travolta gets top billing, Kudrow is the film's true manic engine, and her ability to carry off perky amorality propels the preposterous plot forward through numerous twists and setbacks [...] Her co-star, looking bloated and inert, appears to have settled into the role of the fall guy rather than even attempt to be an active participant. Ephron doesn't look as if she has her heart in the job either. Yes, the film is dark (literally as well as figuratively, since certain scenes are almost murky), but the director doesn't seem to want to acknowledge that the material is as cantankerous as it is. Time and time again, she keeps pulling back from the abyss just when Resnick's story lets us know that it's ready to abandon all social decency and hurl itself over the edge."

Lisa Schwarzbaum of Entertainment Weekly graded the film with a "D" and commented, "The laughs are few in this inert, ungenerous comedy because Ephron's tendency to condescend to her characters, coupled with Harrisburg-born Resnick's mocking worldview [...] makes for a queasy time." She added everyone in the cast is "ill-served by the director's rhythmless pacing, her muddy visual sense, and her insistence on reducing characters to caricatures."
