= Joe DeNardo =

American meteorologist and television weather forecaster (1930–2018)

- Born: Joseph William DeNardo; November 27, 1930; Martins Ferry, Ohio, U.S.
- Died: June 15, 2018 (aged 87); Moon Township, Pennsylvania, U.S.
- Education: Duquesne University; University of Chicago (MS)
- Occupations: Meteorologist, television weather forecaster

Joseph William DeNardo (November 27, 1930 – June 15, 2018) was an American meteorologist and television weather forecaster based in Pennsylvania. He was known for his work in the Pittsburgh television market, particularly at WTAE-TV.

== Early life and education ==
DeNardo was born in Martins Ferry, Ohio, and attended Wheeling Central Catholic High School in Wheeling, West Virginia.

He graduated from Duquesne University with a degree in mathematics and physics, and later received a master's degree in meteorology from the University of Chicago.

== Career ==
DeNardo served in the United States Air Force for four years and was later assigned to Greater Pittsburgh Air Force Base. After leaving military service, he co-founded DeNardo and McFarland Weather Services, a private forecasting business based at the Allegheny County Airport that provided forecasts and consulting services.

He later worked in television weather in Pittsburgh, including at KDKA-TV, before joining WTAE-TV in 1969. He remained at WTAE for several decades and retired in 2005.

== Community work ==
DeNardo was associated with several charitable and public-service efforts in the Pittsburgh area, including WTAE-TV's Project Bundle-Up and other work with The Salvation Army. In 2012, a road in Moon Park in Moon Township, Pennsylvania, was renamed Joe DeNardo Way in his honor.
