= 2016 Wilkinsburg shooting =

2016 mass shooting in Pennsylvania, U.S.

- Location of Pennsylvania in the United States
- Location: 40.4381°N 79.8728°W; Wilkinsburg, Pennsylvania, U.S.
- Date: March 9, 2016; 10 years ago c. 11:00 p.m.
- Attack type: Mass shooting
- Weapons: 7.62×39mm rifle; .40-caliber pistol
- Deaths: 6 (including an unborn child)
- Injuries: 3
- Perpetrator: Unknown
- Accused: Cheron Shelton and Robert Thomas
- Verdict: Not guilty

On March 9, 2016, six people were killed and three others injured in a mass shooting at a suburban house in Wilkinsburg, Pennsylvania, United States, near Pittsburgh. One of the victims was a pregnant woman, whose unborn baby was added to the number of fatalities on the day after the shooting. Two men, Cheron Shelton and Robert Thomas, were charged in connection with the shooting, but charges against Thomas were later dropped and Shelton was acquitted at trial in 2020.

== Shooting ==
The shooting occurred while the victims were holding a backyard party at which about fifteen people were present at the time. According to officials, shortly before 11:00 p.m., one gunman who was situated in a nearby alley fired shots from a .40-caliber pistol and forced several people onto the back porch. The other gunman, equipped with a 7.62 mm caliber rifle and situated in the yard of an adjacent residence, then ambushed and shot the victims as they tried to enter the house through a backdoor. Afterwards, the gunmen fled the scene on foot.

Witnesses reported hearing 30–40 gunshots; a total of 48 shell casings were recovered from the scene. Allegheny County District Attorney Stephen Zappala described the shooting as a "planned and calculated" attack. He added that they were not "just squeezing shots off randomly" because "all of them were headshots", and he believed one or two of the victims may have been targeted and the rest were collateral damage. A $20,000 reward for information on the shooting was announced.

== Victims ==
Four people died at the scene and a fifth died after being taken to UPMC Mercy. On March 10, 2016, the eight-month-old fetus of one of the victims was added to the list of fatalities, bringing the death toll to six. The victims are:

- Jerry Shelton, 35
- Tina Shelton, 37
- Brittany Powell, 27, sister of Jerry Shelton
- Chanetta Powell, 25, sister of Jerry Shelton; her unborn baby was also killed
- Shada Mahone, 26

Three others were injured in the shooting. Two of them, both men, were in critical condition, while the third, a woman, was treated and released. One survivor, 51-year-old John Ellis, died on September 15, 2020, after being taken to UPMC Mercy Hospital for complications. It was not immediately clear if the cause of death could be attributed to the shooting, which caused a spinal cord injury that left Ellis paralyzed from the waist down.

== Suspects ==
On June 23, 2016, Zappala announced that charges were being filed against Pittsburgh residents Cheron Shelton (no relation to Jerry and Tina Shelton) and Robert Thomas, who had long been considered prime suspects. Their alleged target was Lamont Powell, one of the injured victims. He was allegedly targeted as revenge for his suspected role in the 2013 murder of Shelton's friend, Calvin Doswell, in Pittsburgh's Lincoln-Lemington neighborhood, the same area where Shelton was raised. The case against Robert Thomas was later dismissed. Cheron Shelton was later found not guilty in the shooting. Cheron Shelton later pled guilty to a charge of possession of a firearm and ammunition by a convicted felon. Cheron Shelton was later sentenced to eight years in federal prison via FCI Hazelton.

== Reactions ==
Pennsylvania Governor Tom Wolf issued a statement offering support and assistance in the investigation. U.S. Representative Keith Rothfus called the shooting a "senseless act of violence" and expressed his condolences to the families of the victims. U.S. Senator Bob Casey, Jr. issued a statement urging more action to be taken against the issue of gun violence. WTAE-TV news anchor Wendy Bell was fired in March 2016 after posting comments following the shooting, including: "You needn't be a criminal profiler to draw a mental sketch of the killers who broke so many hearts two weeks ago Wednesday... they are young black men." WTAE-TV's president and general manager publicly apologized for the incident on air.
