= Paul Shannon =

American journalist (1909–90)

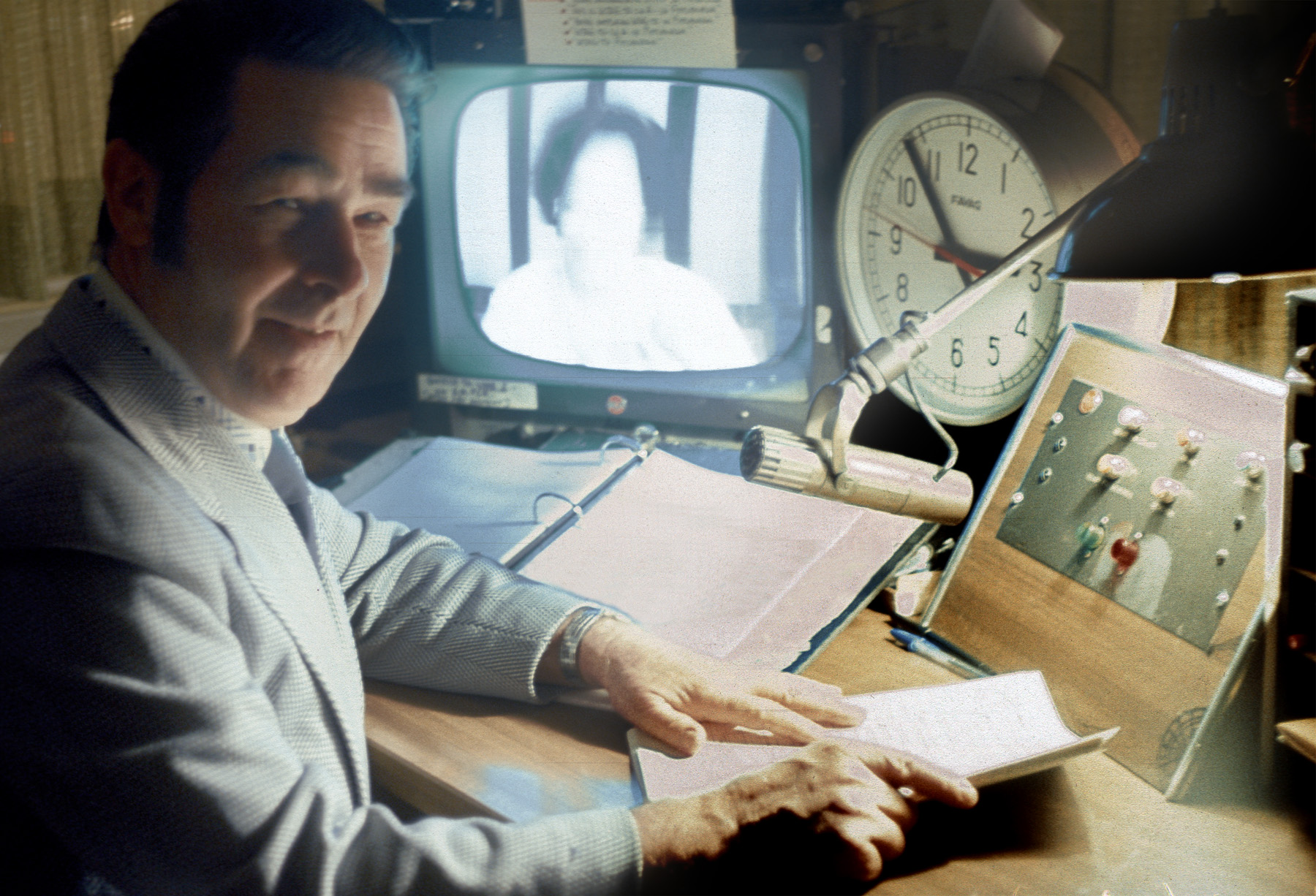
- Shannon in announcer booth at WTAE-TV, March 1975
- Born: November 11, 1909; Crafton, Pennsylvania, U.S.
- Died: July 25, 1990 (aged 80); Lantana, Florida, U.S.
- Resting place: Queen of Heaven Catholic Cemetery
- Occupation: Actor

Paul Vincent Shannon (November 11, 1909 – July 25, 1990) was a Pittsburgh radio and television announcer best known for hosting the local children's television show, Adventure Time, and for his part in bringing about the early sixties resurgence of The Three Stooges.

== Career ==
Shannon worked for years at KDKA radio in Pittsburgh, Pennsylvania, and hosted his own show as the Dream Weaver, reading romantic poetry to electric organ accompaniment in the style of Peter Grant on the famous Cincinnati radio program Moon River over WLW. He also hosted the syndicated science-focused program Adventures in Research with Thomas Phillips.

After moving to WTAE-TV, Shannon became a Pittsburgh legend, particularly to the baby boom generation, as host of the popular children's television block Adventure Time. The show aired on WTAE channel 4 in the afternoons. The show showed Three Stooges shorts, the vast library of Warner Bros. Cartoons, Rocky and Bullwinkle cartoons, Little Rascals shorts, and the first color anime, Kimba the White Lion, in serialised form along with skits and songs.

Shannon played to a studio audience that attended each broadcast, usually scout troops, and amused his audiences with his alter ego, "Nosmo King", a play on "No Smoking" signs (but not to be confused with H. Vernon Watson (1886–1949), the British music hall artist who also performed as Nosmo King).

He used a prop he dubbed "The Magic Sword".

A high point of the show came each Christmas season, when Shannon read children's letters to Santa Claus, placed them into a rocket, and launched it to the North Pole.

Shannon was one of several 1950s–1960s children's TV hosts to begin presenting reruns of the Three Stooges on Adventure Time, bringing the trio's 1930s and 1940s comedy shorts to an entirely new audience. It helped revive the Stooges as a viable act at a time when they were considered ancient history, leading to an entirely new career of stage and film appearances. In gratitude to Shannon and several other hosts, the Stooges featured them in cameo roles in their feature films. Shannon played Wild Bill Hickok in the Three Stooges film The Outlaws Is Coming.

He retired and moved to Lantana, Florida, in 1975, and died there of brain cancer at age 80 in 1990.
