= Adventure Time (1958 TV series) =

American children's TV show

- Also known as: Six O'Clock Adventure (September 15, 1958–August 7, 1961)
- Genre: Children's television series
- Directed by: John J. Vince
- Presented by: Paul Shannon; Joe Negri
- Narrated by: Paul Shannon; Joe Negri
- Theme music composer: Joe Negri
- Country of origin: United States
- Original language: English
- No. of seasons: 22

Original release
- Network: WTAE-TV
- Release: September 15, 1958 – February 18, 1979

Adventure Time was a local children's television show on WTAE-TV 4 in Pittsburgh, Pennsylvania, from September 15, 1958 to February 18, 1979. It was hosted by Paul Shannon from 1958 until his retirement in 1975, accompanied by guitarist Joe Negri and puppeteer Jim Martin. Negri took over as the show's host from 1975 until 1979.

== Series background ==
Each episode of Adventure Time featured a variety of segments, constantly changing pace to keep children engaged. The show made great use of a variety of cartoons and other comedic clips interspersed between live action segments. The cartoons were often introduced by Paul Shannon lowering a "magic sword" and reciting the phrase, "Down goes the curtain, and back up again for...", completing the phrase with the title of the featured cartoon. Commonly used cartoons included Rocky and Bullwinkle, Kimba the White Lion, Dodo, the Kid from Outer Space, Koko the Clown, Beanie and Cecil, Space Angel, Dick Tracy, Krazy Kat, Snuffy Smith, Popeye, and Beetle Bailey. The latter four cartoons were produced by King Features Syndicate, whose parent company is also WTAE's current owner.

In addition to animated segments, Shannon also frequently showed old Three Stooges shorts. These were introduced by Shannon spinning the "Stooge-O-Scope", a mounted wheel with pictures of the six comic actors who played the Three Stooges attached to it. As the wheel spun, the camera would zoom into it, fading first to black and then back out to that day's episode of the Stooges. In his book, Moe Howard gave Shannon and Adventure Time major credit for the Stooges' national revival in the 1960s. Shannon also appeared in one of the Stooges' full-length features, The Outlaws Is Coming, as Wild Bill Hickok.

In addition to his hosting duties, Shannon periodically portrayed his alter ego, Nosmo King, a mysteriously silent, bearded man in dark sunglasses, who stalked about the studio in a slouch hat and tan raincoat. Nosmo was also featured "driving his car" around Pittsburgh, or playing a one-man-band type instrument to well-known tunes such as The Beatles' "I Saw Her Standing There". The character reportedly got his name from a "No Smoking" sign. Other popular characters in the series included Happy Howard (The Friendly Spider), Randy Rocket and The Great Mysto the Magician.

The studio audience was generally composed of children's groups such as Boy Scout, Cub Scout, Girl Scout, Brownie, and Camp Fire Girl troops. Shannon regularly featured a "Picture Gallery", either pretending to play a player piano or broadcasting recorded songs, such as The Toys' "A Lover's Concerto", while viewer-submitted drawings and coloring pages scrolled across the screen. Occasionally, the show hosted various viewer contests; among the most notable of these was a 1966 opportunity to meet the Three Stooges at the local Kennywood Park. In 1968 another contest winner was allowed to name a new roller coaster at Kennywood. The viewer chose to name it "The Thunderbolt", and it remains active at the park today.

A high point of the show came each Christmas season, when Paul Shannon loaded children's letters to Santa Claus into a rocket and launched it to the North Pole. Santa later opened and read the letters on the air.

Joe Negri took over the show after Shannon retired in 1975. Negri, the music director for ABC affiliate WTAE from 1960 to 1982, was involved with several children's shows for the station. He portrayed Mr. Music on "Rickie and Copper", hosted "Popeye with Joe and Sandy" as well as "High School Talent Scene", and played Handyman Negri on Mister Rogers' Neighborhood.

Jim Martin's main puppet character in the series was Baby Jeffy. The puppet was lost at one point during production, and Negri claimed that Martin reacted "like Jeffy was kidnapped." Martin later became a puppeteer for Sesame Street.

== See also ==
- List of local children's television series
