= WQED-FM =

Pittsburgh, Pennsylvania; United States
- Broadcast area: Pittsburgh metropolitan area
- Frequency: 89.3 MHz (HD Radio)
- Branding: WQED-FM 89.3

Programming
- Format: Classical
- Subchannels: HD1: WQED-FM analog; HD2: Classical "Pittsburgh Concert Channel"
- Affiliations: National Public Radio

Ownership
- Owner: WQED Multimedia
- Sister stations: TV: WQED

History
- First air date: January 25, 1973
- Call sign meaning: Quod erat demonstrandum ("What has been shown")

Technical information
- Licensing authority: FCC
- Facility ID: 54002
- Class: B
- ERP: 28,000 watts (analog); 1,120 watts (digital)
- HAAT: 199 meters (653 ft)
- Transmitter coordinates: 40°26′46.2″N 79°57′50.2″W
- Repeater: See § Simulcast

Links
- Public license information: Public file; LMS
- Webcast: Listen live; HD2: Listen live
- Website: www.wqed.org/fm

WQED-FM (89.3 MHz) is a non-commercial, public radio station licensed to serve Pittsburgh, Pennsylvania. The station is owned by WQED Multimedia, and broadcasts a classical format. It is a sister station to the Pittsburgh area's PBS member station, WQED (TV). Both stations broadcast from a shared tower located on the main campus of the University of Pittsburgh at (40°26′46.0″N 79°57′50.0″W).

WQED-FM annually produces a 26-week series of Pittsburgh Symphony broadcasts for distribution via the Public Radio Exchange.

WQED-FM uses HD Radio, and broadcasts archived concert performances by local performance groups on its HD2 subchannel.

WQED-FM is Local Primary Emergency Alert System Station 2 for the Pittsburgh Extended area.

== History ==
The station began broadcasting on January 25, 1973, and began using HD Radio in January 2006. HD2 programming began in 2012.

== Simulcast ==
One full power station simulcasts the programming of WQED-FM:

Call sign	Frequency	City of license	Facility ID	ERP W	Height m (ft)	Class	Transmitter coordinates
WQEJ	89.7 FM	Johnstown, Pennsylvania	54003	8,400	361 m (1,184 ft)	B	40°22′17.3″N 78°58′55.1″W
