= WQED Multimedia =

Non-profit public broadcasting organization

WQED Multimedia is an American nonprofit corporation based in Pittsburgh, Pennsylvania that owns and operates three public broadcasting stations:

- Television station WQED (TV) (VHF channel 4)
- Radio stations WQED-FM (89.3 FM Pittsburgh) and WQEJ-FM (89.7 FM Johnstown, PA)

The TV station is a member of PBS, the radio station airs classical music, and WQEJ-FM simulcasts the WQED radio station. The company's headquarters and production facility is located on Fifth Avenue near the Carnegie Mellon University campus.

From 1970 to 2009, the company also owned and published Pittsburgh Magazine.

== History ==
WQED signed on the air on April 1, 1954, as the first community-sponsored educational television station in the United States.

WQED has partnered with local community organizations to improve arts, education, culture, community health, economics and local issues through civic journalism. WQED's mission is to create and share outstanding public media that educates, entertains and inspires.

== Mister Rogers' Neighborhood ==
Fred Rogers of Mister Rogers' Neighborhood hosted his namesake show that was recorded at WQED's studio for over three decades on PBS, teaching lifelong lessons to children using storytelling and teaching them to use their imagination.

Rogers then returned to Pittsburgh in 1953 and started his work with WQED. He created "The Children's Corner" for WQED, which then led to the development of a 15-min version of Mister Rogers' Neighborhood for television in Canada, but soon returned to Pittsburgh. In 1968, the program debuted on National Educational Television and ran until 2001. It reached over 8 million households on over 300 PBS stations. Rogers' pioneering program was one of the first to encourage children's self-esteem, self-control, cooperation, ability to confront and deal with problems, appreciate diversity and other critical life values and behaviors.

Rogers retired in 2001 and died in 2003. Before his death, he was married to Joanna, with whom he had two sons, James and Joseph, and two grandsons.

== Sale of WQEX ==
In 1959, WQEX (channel 16) was launched for the purpose of classroom instructional content. The network provided specialized educational television starting in 1963, through WQEX. It was the first time that a station used management training and vocational education in Pittsburgh.

In 1996, WQED tried to sell WQEX, but the Federal Communications Commission denied WQED's request. The network pleaded financial hardship, and eventually, the sale was authorized. After that, WQEX would later become WINP-TV.

== Transmitter ==
WQED's transmitter is located in the Oakland neighborhood, near the campus of the University of Pittsburgh. In addition, the transmitter also supports WINP-TV, a broadcast translator of ABC affiliate WTAE-TV (on UHF channel 22), and some additional low-power stations.

On July 1, 2019, WQED changed its frequency to VHF digital channel 4.
