= WTAE-TV =

Television station in Pittsburgh

- Pittsburgh, Pennsylvania; United States
- Channels: Digital: 27 (UHF); Virtual: 4
- Branding: WTAE Channel 4; 4 Pittsburgh; Pittsburgh's Action News 4

Programming
- Affiliations: 4.1: ABC; for others, see § Subchannels

Ownership
- Owner: Hearst Television; (Hearst Stations Inc.)

History
- Founded: July 25, 1957
- First air date: September 14, 1958
- Former channel numbers: Analog: 4 (VHF, 1958–2009); Digital: 51 (UHF, 1999–2018)
- Call sign meaning: Former television sibling of WCAE radio (the present day WPGP)

Technical information
- Licensing authority: FCC
- Facility ID: 65681
- ERP: 1,000 kW
- HAAT: 269.2 m (883 ft)
- Transmitter coordinates: 40°16′49″N 79°48′10″W
- Translator(s): 22 (UHF) (4.3) Pittsburgh's Oakland neighborhood

Links
- Public license information: Public file; LMS
- Website: www.wtae.com

WTAE-TV (channel 4) is a television station in Pittsburgh, Pennsylvania, United States, affiliated with ABC. It has been owned by Hearst Television since the station's inception, making this one of two stations that have been built and signed on by Hearst (alongside company flagship WBAL-TV in Baltimore). WTAE-TV's studios are located on Ardmore Boulevard (PA 8) in the suburb of Wilkinsburg (though with a Pittsburgh mailing address), and its transmitter is located in Buena Vista, Pennsylvania.

== History ==
WTAE-TV began broadcasting on September 14, 1958; the station has been Pittsburgh's ABC affiliate since its sign-on.

Pittsburgh had only one major commercial television station for close to a decade—DuMont-owned WDTV (channel 2, now KDKA-TV), which signed on in 1949 and carried programs from all four television networks (DuMont, ABC, NBC and CBS). Further development of stations in Pittsburgh was halted by the Federal Communications Commission (FCC)'s freeze on license awards, which ran from 1948 until 1952. Even after the freeze was lifted by the FCC, new VHF stations in Pittsburgh were held back to give the smaller cities in the Upper Ohio Valley a chance to get on the owing to VHF band limitations.

Several months after the freeze was lifted, two UHF stations in Pittsburgh, WENS-TV (channel 16, now WINP-TV) and WKJF-TV (channel 53, now WPGH-TV), went on the air. For technical and financial reasons, both stations were short-lived. Meanwhile, revisions to the VHF allocation had given the Pittsburgh area three additional channels—4, 11, and 13, the latter reserved for non-commercial educational purposes. The channel 4 frequency on which WTAE-TV began operations during the analog television era was originally allocated to suburban McKeesport, in Allegheny County; other official documents have listed the community of license as Irwin, in Westmoreland County.

Hearings on the channel 4 permit opened in 1955, and it was originally granted by the FCC to KQV radio in 1956. Hearst and the other three applicants that lost petitioned the FCC to re-open the permit hearings following the death of KQV co-owner Irwin D. Wolf. The subsequent reconsideration awarded channel 4 to Hearst. The agency's commissioners were divided on how to break the stalemate to the satisfaction of both winning parties, and suggested a merger between Hearst and the KQV group, who sold their radio station to ABC to appease FCC cross-ownership restrictions. Together, both firms became equal partners in Television City, Inc., under which ownership WTAE-TV went on the air. Hearst would purchase the remaining 50 percent of the station in 1962. WTAE-TV is the only Pittsburgh television station affiliated with a major network not to have changed ownership.

Shortly before the station signed on, the FCC moved the channel 4 assignment to Pittsburgh proper following several years of petitioning by then-Pittsburgh mayor (and future Governor of Pennsylvania) David L. Lawrence. However, the FCC changed its rules so that channel 4 could have based its main studio in Pittsburgh, even if it had been licensed to McKeesport or Irwin. The station's original ownership group's connections with powerful U.S. Senator from Florida, George Smathers led to televised U.S. House hearings with both Lawrence and Smathers testifying in 1958. To fit Channel 4 into Pittsburgh, the allocation was short-spaced to surrounding channel 4 stations in Detroit, Michigan; Columbus, Ohio; Oak Hill, West Virginia; Buffalo, New York; and Washington, D.C.; the transmitter was located southeast of the city as a result of the short-spacing. Shortly after signing on, WTAE-TV was briefly affiliated with the NTA Film Network, sharing the affiliation with KDKA-TV, WIIC-TV (now WPXI), and WQED.

On April 24, 1980, WTAE-TV personality Nick Perry, who hosted Bowling for Dollars and also called the lottery drawings for the Pennsylvania Lottery, fixed the Lottery's daily numbers drawing so that it would come up as "6-6-6". Perry served jail time, and the drawings were moved to WHP-TV in Harrisburg a year later by orders of Governor Dick Thornburgh. This resulted in lotteries now being audited and monitored with "witnesses" from the government and/or accounting firms, and also inspired the movie Lucky Numbers. KDKA-TV aired the Lottery drawings in the Pittsburgh market after this incident until 2009, when they moved back to WTAE-TV.

In April 1985, WTAE-TV became the only station in the United States to transmit the World Wrestling Federation's WrestleMania event free over-the-air, after a technical glitch prematurely ended the event's closed-circuit broadcast from the Civic Arena. (Note: This mishap is mistakenly attributed to WrestleMania 2 in the True Story of WrestleMania DVD and Blu-ray release.)

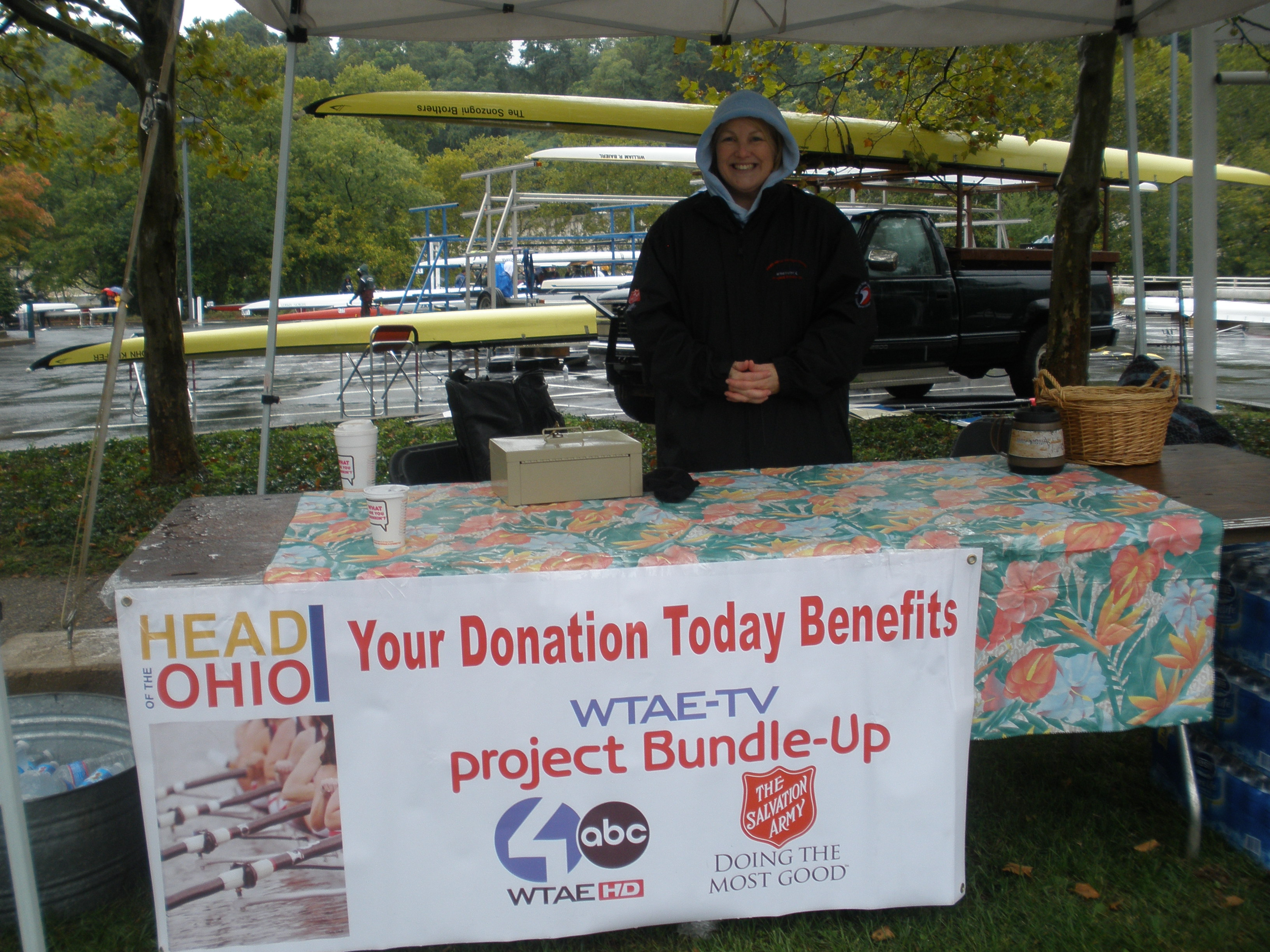
WTAE-TV and The Salvation Army collecting funds for Project Bundle Up at the 2011 Head of the Ohio regatta.

In 1986, WTAE-TV partnered with The Salvation Army and started Project Bundle Up, an operation to make sure that children and seniors receive warm clothing. WTAE-TV has run the Project Bundle Up Auction where local businesses donate products to be auctioned off, and the Project Bundle Up Telethon, where viewers call in to donate money. Businesses donate money and all of their proceeds from the auction and telethon to benefit the Salvation Army. In 2007, WTAE-TV moved the auction to the Internet.

In early 2001, Hearst bought Clarksburg, West Virginia–based NBC affiliate WBOY-TV, which has a significant Grade A signal overlap with WTAE-TV (a year earlier, the FCC began to allow companies to own television stations with overlapping coverage areas). However, Hearst decided to sell WBOY-TV to West Virginia Media Holdings in September of that year after less than a year of ownership; that station is now owned by Nexstar Media Group, who to this day does not own or operate a station serving Pittsburgh.

In June 2011, a WTAE-TV staff photographer was charged with a sexual crime when an alleged victim stated that the photographer had inappropriate physical contact with her. The photographer arrived in a WTAE-TV news vehicle with station equipment and claimed he was doing an interview, although WTAE-TV management claims that he was not on duty at the time—even though he was using station resources.

== Programming ==
In the early years, Channel 4 was best known in the market for its locally originated entertainment programming, including popular early program late night movie show Shock Theatre, which was hosted by former Pittsburgh radio disc jockey Bob Drews, who portrayed Sir Rodger (often misspelled as Sir Roger). Shock Theatre featured monster movies such as The Invisible Man and Frankenstein in-between live-action comedic skits. By the 1970s, WTAE-TV was running a mix of cartoons and sitcoms from 6:30 to 9 a.m., a local talk show, some ABC shows, more cartoons and off-network sitcoms in the afternoon, news and some first run shows in the evening, and ABC prime time programming.

=== Sports programming ===
Owing to parent company Hearst's 20% minority stake in ESPN, WTAE-TV has the right of first refusal for Monday Night Football games featuring the Pittsburgh Steelers; the station has aired all MNF games since the program's inception in 1970, even though the program moved from ABC to ESPN after the 2005 season. WTAE-TV aired the Steelers' Super Bowl XL victory in 2006, which was the last NFL game shown on ABC until the 2015 Wild Card game. Since 2025, the station airs any Steelers simulcasts from ESPN, NFL Network, or Prime Video including the 2025 and 2026 Steelers games in Dublin and Paris respectively from NFL Network.

WTAE-TV also aired select Pittsburgh Pirates games via ABC's MLB broadcast contract from 1976 to 1989, including the team's 1979 World Series championship.

WTAE-TV serves as the over-the-air television provider for the Pittsburgh Penguins via ESPN/ABC's NHL broadcasting contract from 2022 to 2028.

=== Past program preemptions and deferrals ===
Although it was the only ABC affiliate in the region when it signed on at the time, WTAE-TV preempted and/or delayed a considerable amount of ABC programming, most notably some of its daytime lineup from the 1960s to the late 1990s. WTAE-TV did not begin running Good Morning America until December 1978, and only aired an hour of the program until 1980. One Life to Live did not run on WTAE-TV from its 1968 debut up until 1978, when the soap opera expanded to an hour-long format. Another soap opera, The Edge of Night, was aired at 10 a.m. on a delay from December 2, 1975 (the day after its relocation from CBS to ABC) until August 13, 1982. From 1969 to 1971, and again from 1974 to 1979, ABC shows that were not broadcast on channel 4 ended up airing instead on WPGH-TV. After 1980, some of these shows ran on WPTT (channel 22, now WPNT). WTAE-TV also preempted the Sunday morning ABC children's programming block the entire time ABC offered it, as well as a couple of hours of ABC's Saturday morning cartoons until 1979. WTAE-TV ran syndicated cartoons in place of the network-supplied children's programs, while the preempted Saturday morning network programs (including American Bandstand) aired on WPGH during that time.

By the 1980s, WTAE-TV was running many of the top rated off-network syndicated sitcoms from 4 to 6 p.m. By 1990, WTAE-TV was beginning to focus more on news, and in 1992 dropped the entire ABC Saturday morning cartoon lineup for a 4 1/2 hour newscast (which WPXI was also doing, beginning in 1990). WTAE-TV also expanded its midday newscast to an hour and dropped The Home Show during 1991. Loving was dropped from the daytime lineup in January 1991 and moved to overnights, then dropped from the schedule altogether in 1992. Later in the decade, WTAE-TV also did not carry Mike and Maty or The City. WTAE-TV began carrying Port Charles in January 1998, but dropped the show entirely in September 2000, three years shy of its cancellation by ABC, and replaced it with Judge Hatchett, which itself was replaced by Access Hollywood in 2004. Beginning in 1996, WTAE-TV began running two hours of the ABC Saturday cartoon lineup on Sunday mornings, a half-hour on Saturday mornings, and a half-hour at 12:30 p.m. In 1997, the station cut back its Saturday morning newscast to three hours at 7 to 10 a.m. and began running three hours of the ABC children's lineup from 10 a.m. to 1 p.m. Today, though it still offers a news-intensive schedule, WTAE-TV clears the entire ABC lineup. Viewers and ABC had also begun to clamor for The View, which premiered in 1997 to acclaim, and success compared to ABC's past late morning programs (and was also under the network's full editorial control), to air in Pittsburgh at its prescribed time. WTAE had continued to delay The View to late night until March 27, 2000, when it began to air in its proper 11 a.m. time slot.

WTAE-TV was one of many ABC stations that preempted the special showing of Saving Private Ryan in late 2004 due to concerns that the FCC would impose a fine on them if they had aired the World War II–set movie due to the Super Bowl XXXVIII halftime show controversy earlier that year. The station, along with other Hearst-owned ABC affiliated stations, aired the 1992 film Far and Away instead. ABC affiliate WYTV in Youngstown, Ohio, still aired Saving Private Ryan, giving viewers in the northern and western portions of WTAE-TV's viewing area the option of watching the film. It was later determined that the movie's broadcast was not a violation of FCC regulations.

=== News operation ===
WTAE-TV presently broadcasts 43 hours of locally produced newscasts each week (with 6 1/2 hours each weekday, five hours on Saturdays and 5 1/2 hours on Sundays). Like its NBC rival, WPXI, Channel 4 was not a major player in news coverage in its early years, as the Pittsburgh market was dominated by KDKA-TV and anchor Bill Burns. That changed in 1969, when longtime KDKA radio-and-TV newscaster Paul Long joined WTAE-TV, along with his KDKA meteorologist-sidekick Joe DeNardo. WTAE-TV was known for the "legendary" news crew of Paul Long and Don Cannon from the late 1960s into the 1990s.

Sports has been a major division at WTAE-TV. In 1972, WTAE-TV sportscaster Myron Cope, thanks to a phone call from a female fan, introduced the phrase "The Immaculate Reception" to describe Franco Harris' miraculous, running shoestring catch that gave the Pittsburgh Steelers a 13–7 playoff victory over the Oakland Raiders (Cope chuckled at the woman's call, and responded, "I'm not sure I can say that!" Cope figured out an innocuous way to introduce the phrase on air, prefacing the remark by saying, "It comes from a good Christian lady.") WTAE-TV and its channel 4 logo was immortalized in the 1979 basketball comedy film The Fish That Saved Pittsburgh, whose fictional sportscaster Murray Sports (played by Harry Shearer) was also patterned after Cope. The last sports director was Andrew Stockey, who left the position in 2006 to become a news anchor. However, in 2011, he returned to head the sports department.

In the fall of 1990, WTAE gave Pittsburgh its first 5am newscast and expanded its one-hour morning newscast to two hours, shifting the starting time from 6 a.m. to 5 a.m. The move took place the same day KDKA expanded its half-hour morning newscast to an hour and started it at 6 a.m. As it gained news in the morning, WTAE lost news at noon. The station's noon news (it was brought back in early 1992) and the resumption of a noon newscast meant Channel 4 had gone full circle in a very short time. It had dropped the noon news and plugged the slot with the short lived game show The Challengers (which only lasted one season) and Graham Kerr's cooking program (which lasted one season as well) before Good Day Pittsburgh.

In June 1992, the station expanded its news production, adding a Saturday morning newscast from 8 a.m. to 12:30 p.m. (matching WPXI's Saturday morning newscast of the then-same length, which began in 1990) and a three-hour Sunday morning newscast. The station also extended its weekday early evening newscast to begin at 5 p.m, and began to air a weekday morning newscast from 5 to 7 a.m. In 1997, the station expanded its Sunday morning newscast by an hour and began to air its Saturday morning newscast from 6 to 10 a.m.

In 2002, Jean Connelly became the first woman from Western Pennsylvania to be inducted into the Pennsylvania Broadcasters Hall of Fame. In doing so, she joined ranks with Paul Long, David Crantz, and Fred Young. Connelly is famous for producing and hosting her own talk show, The Jean Connelly Show. WTAE-TV unveiled a new set designed by FX Group during the 5 p.m. newscast on September 4, 2007. That year, WTAE-TV debuted a YouTube channel, which features stories featured on channel 4's newscasts. On September 15, 2008, WTAE-TV became the second station in the market to begin broadcasting its local newscasts in high definition. Field reports continued to be broadcast in 4:3 standard-definition until September 2011, when field reports began to be broadcast in 16:9 SD.

At the end of 2011, WTAE-TV on-air talent took to both Twitter and Facebook to voice their opinions about unfair treatment by management. The Pittsburgh Post-Gazette reported that WTAE-TV's on-air staff claimed it was being denied severance benefits for employees fired without cause, a minimum salary scale, overtime pay for work hours totaling more than eight hours a day, retirement benefits equalling those of other employees at the station, and consideration for unscheduled call-outs, split shifts and work on the sixth consecutive day and thereafter. Former general manager Michael Hayes stated that bargaining had been taking place in good faith. An online petition was launched in support of the anchors, reporters, meteorologists, and sportscasters.

==== New studio set for newscasts ====
On April 28, 2016, WTAE became the third television station in the Pittsburgh DMA to launch a new studio set in Studio B of the WTAE Studios. The design focuses heavily on the use of video monitors, Pittsburgh culture, and HD lighting.

==== Pittsburgh's Action News 4 at 7 on Cozi TV Pittsburgh ====
On January 6, 2016, WTAE announced that the station will add a 7 p.m. newscast on subchannel 4.2 beginning February 1. The newscast will be hosted by current weekend morning anchor Jackie Cain and chief meteorologist Mike Harvey. "We understand viewers are constantly looking for news, no matter what time of the day," said WTAE President & general manager Charles W. Wolfertz III. "Our new 7 p.m. newscast will give viewers more options to get news and weather information when they want it. Whether it's on our traditional broadcast station, on-line, or on a mobile device, WTAE Channel 4 is always looking for more ways to make it convenient for our viewers to get the local news and weather that's important to them."

==== Chronicle ====
In June 2013, WTAE-TV announced that longtime anchor Sally Wiggin would host WTAE Chronicle, a series of hour-long news specials dedicated to in-depth reporting on relevant topics to Pittsburgh and Western Pennsylvania. The format was lifted from Boston sister station WCVB-TV, where their Chronicle has been on the air since 1982, albeit in the form of a weeknight, half-hour news-magazine. Wiggin shifted from her role as anchor of WTAE-TV's noon newscast to focus on WTAE Chronicle and additional station projects. Chronicle debuted on WTAE-TV in March 2013, with a report from Vatican City on the election of Pope Francis.

The second edition focused on the importance of "The Point"—the iconic area of downtown Pittsburgh where the three rivers meet.

The third edition of Chronicle aired on December 3, 2013 ("Concussions & Our Kids") which focused on brain injuries in youth sports; and the fourth installment aired on March 25 called "Living Like Lou" a special on Pittsburghers with ALS. The original broadcast was accompanied simultaneously with a one-hour telethon to raise funds for ALS assistance; it resulted in over $130,000 raised.

A fifth edition debuted on September 15 right after the season premiere of Dancing with the Stars called Chronicle: The New Pittsburgh. It focused on the rebirth and growth of Pittsburgh in the past twenty years.

The sixth edition was centered on the highly debated topic around fracking or natural gas drilling in Western Pennsylvania. The edition titled "Drilling Down" was the first look at the topic from three perspectives: the drilling companies, the protesters, and the communities impacted by the wells.

The seventh edition called Chronicle: Taste of the 'Burgh was aired to massive ratings and focused on Pittsburgh's growing "Foodie" culture, its impact on the local economy, employment, and national attention. It is the highest viewed Chronicle to date.

The eighth edition of Chronicle called "Burning Questions" dealt with the ongoing issue in Western Pennsylvania local fire departments failing to meet the national standards for fire response times. It consisted of a four-month-long investigation, laying the foundation for a comprehensive, eye-opening look at the challenges for first responders. This installment of Chronicle examines how volunteers are struggling to make do with a 200-year-old system, which they believe puts our communities at risk. It was a high-profile installment that opened up discussions with the state, regional, and local leaders to help solve the problem. The ratings for it won the night.

Chronicle: After War, the ninth installment of the series, examined the life of Western Pennsylvania's military men, women and their families after the battle has ended. Local combat veterans are now struggling to find jobs while adjusting to family life and their physical disabilities. America's longest war has ended, and a new generation of veterans is transitioning to life at home. The online live video stream was picked up veterans organizations around the country and the highest watched Chronicle to date.

Chronicle: Dog Stories, the tenth installment of the series, dove into Pittsburgh's love affair with dogs, from the ones that protect us at home and overseas to the shelter culture here in the 'Burgh. It also looked at the shelter culture in Pittsburgh and how humans and dogs have worked together to form an incredible bond.

All ten were ratings hits in the Pittsburgh television market.

==== Awards and honors ====
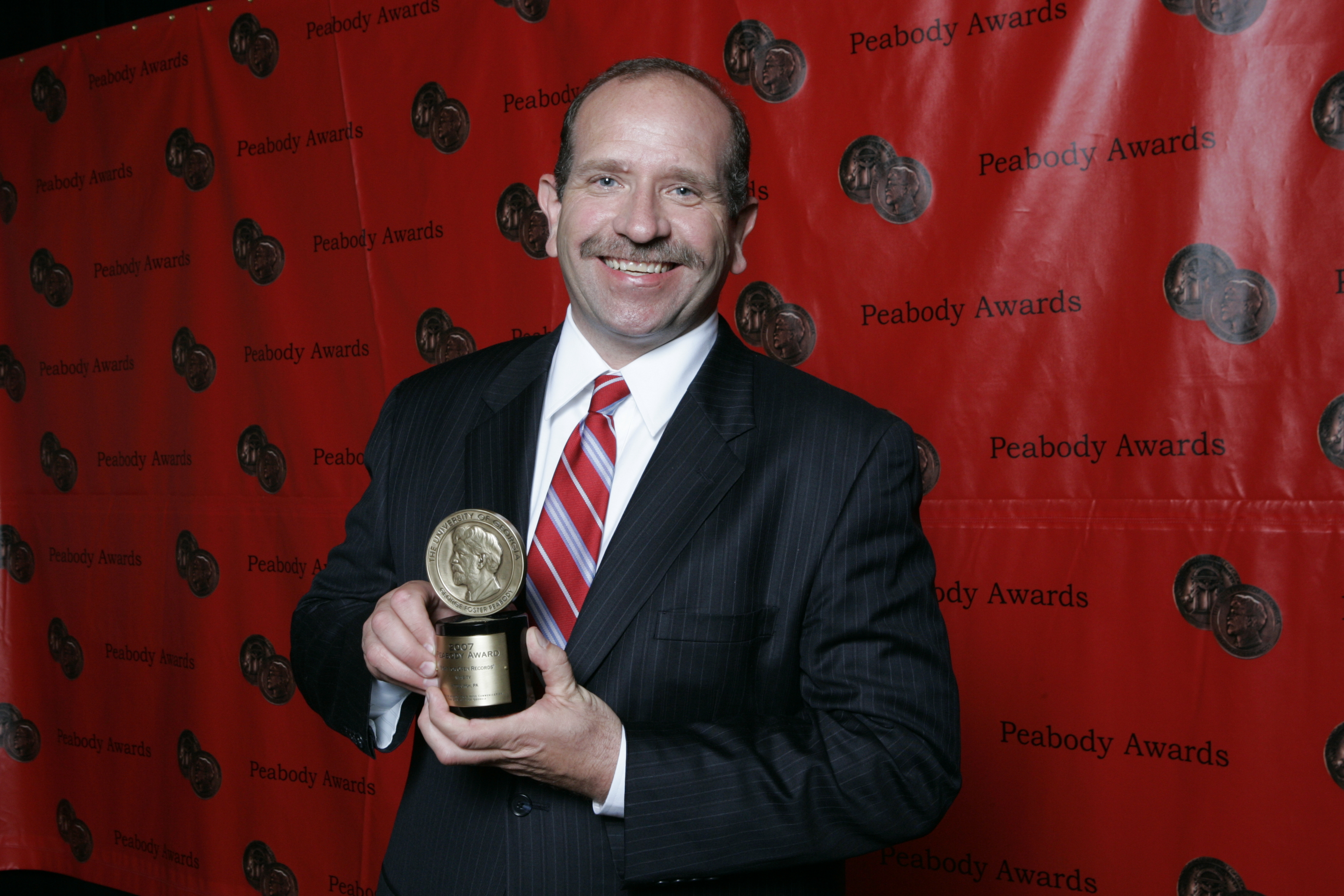
Jim Parsons at the 67th Annual Peabody Awards for Fight for Open Records

In March 2008, the station won a Freedom of Information Award and an IRE Medal from the Investigative Reporters and Editors for "pushing open the front door" of the state-run student loan agency. In April 2008, that same effort resulted in a Peabody Award for the station, in recognition of "station's relentless legal campaign to obtain public records of a state-run student loan program" which "netted evidence of financial misconduct and pushed the state to rewrite an antiquated right-to-know law".

In April 2012, WTAE-TV was awarded the Edward R. Murrow Award for "Video Continuing Coverage" of the Penn State child sex abuse scandal.

In February 2013, the Pennsylvania Association of Broadcasters awarded WTAE-TV the following Awards for Excellence in Broadcasting: Outstanding Television Feature Story/Report/Series, Outstanding Television Breaking News Report, and Outstanding Investigative Report.

In April 2013, WTAE-TV was awarded the Edward R. Murrow Award for "Reporting: Hard News" for the Downtown Pittsburgh office building hostage crisis.

In September 2013, WTAE-TV received 21 nominations for the 2013 Regional Emmy Awards, the second most nominations among all the television stations in the state. WTAE-TV took home numerous awards in six categories including special coverage of the Vatican elections with Mike Clark.

In March 2014, it was announced that WTAE-TV will be awarded three awards by the Pennsylvania Broadcasters Association: "Outstanding Television Documentary Program" for Chronicle, "Outstanding Television Public Affairs Program/Series" for Chronicle, and "Outstanding Television Website" for WTAE.com.

In April 2014, it was announced that WTAE-TV was awarded two Regional Edward R. Murrow Awards by the Radio Television Digital News Association: "Overall Excellence" and "Best Website". WTAE-TV competed against TV stations all across Pennsylvania, New York, and New Jersey; including two of the largest TV markets in the U.S.: New York City and Philadelphia.

In August 2014, it was announced that WTAE-TV was nominated for 25 Emmy Awards by the National Academy of Television Arts and Sciences for the Mid-Atlantic Region. On September 20 at the Emmy Awards Gala, it was confirmed that WTAE-TV won more Emmy awards than any other Western PA television station which included the following awards: Health News (Don't Ask, Don't Research), Health/Environment/Science Program (Chronicle: Living Like Lou), Human Interest (Love Front Porch), Sportscast (September 23, 2013, edition), news Anchor (Wendy Bell), Feature Reporter (Wendy Bell), and for Specialty Reporter (Wendy Bell).

On April 23, 2015, it was announced that WTAE-TV was awarded the Edward R. Murrow Award for Overall Excellence in Television along with an award for Breaking News (for their national coverage of the Franklin Regional Stabbings) and an award Documentary (for Chronicle: Drilling Down edition). This is the second year in a row that WTAE-TV has been awarded the Overall Excellence award; no other Pittsburgh station has achieved that.

In May 2015, Anchor/Host Sally Wiggin was inducted into the Pennsylvania Association of Broadcasters Hall of Fame. Wiggin joined an elite group of Commonwealth broadcasters, and four former WTAE inductees, whose distinguished service has made a positive impact on audiences and the industry.

On August 11, 2015, it was announced that WTAE-TV had been honored with 18 Emmy Award nominations by the National Academy of Television Arts & Sciences for the Mid-Atlantic Region. These nominations were for coverage such as the Franklin Regional HS Stabbings, Investigative Reports, and the various Chronicle editions. Winners will be announced at the Emmy Awards on September 19, 2015. WTAE-TV was awarded the most Emmy nominations among all the television stations in Pittsburgh region. At the Emmy Awards, the station in September received six awards, the most of any standard television in the state and twice as many as its local competitors: WPXI and KDKA.

In 2016, the station won numerous national awards:

- Peabody Award: WTAE earned the Peabody Award from the University of Georgia's Grady College of Journalism for its series of special reports "Burning Questions: Investigation into Fire Response Times". The Peabody Awards recognize distinguished and meritorious public service by TV and radio stations, networks, producing organizations, individuals and the World Wide Web.
- National Headliner Awards: WTAE won five national Headliner Awards for outstanding journalism, and received the top television recognition "Best of Show TV", for Chronicle: Burning Questions.
- Edward R. Murrow Awards: WTAE won six regional Edward R. Murrow Awards for outstanding journalism, bestowed by the Radio Television Digital News Association. In addition to receiving the coveted award for "Overall Excellence", "Action News Investigates" was recognized with the top "Investigative" award for uncovering a loophole in the state pension law allowing dozens of Pennsylvania teachers convicted of violent crimes – including sexual assault and murder – to receive taxpayer-funded pensions. Chronicle: Burning Questions also was honored, in the "News Documentary" and "News Series" categories.
- Investigative Reporters and Editors Award: The annual IRE Awards recognize outstanding investigative work and help identify the techniques and resources used to complete each story. WTAE was a finalist for its series Burning Questions dealing with fire department response times across Western Pennsylvania.
- Pennsylvania Associated Press Broadcasters Awards: WTAE took home 10 first place awards and four second place awards from the Associated Press ranging from the station's Firefighting Series to the Plum School Teacher Sex Scandal. The station also took home the Jim Snyder for Outstanding News Service in 2015.

On September 24, 2016, WTAE-TV received four Emmy Awards from the National Academy of Television Arts and Sciences, including the Overall Excellence award; the highest honor bestowed each year. Chief meteorologist Mike Harvey received two Emmys including excellence in weather.

==== Notable former on-air staff ====
- Scott Baker – anchor (1993–2006)
- Don Cannon – anchor (1969–1994)
- Myron Cope – sports commentary (1970–1995)
- Faith Daniels – anchor/reporter (1983–1985)
- Joe DeNardo – chief meteorologist (1969–2004)
- Debra Fox – reporter/anchor (1976–1986)
- Keith Jones – reporter/fill-in anchor (2010–2012)
- Joe Negri – co-host/musician (1965–1985)
- Stan Savran – sports anchor (1980–1991)
- Mike Schneider – reporter/anchor (1977–1982)
- Paul Shannon – host of Adventure Time (1959–1975)
- John Steigerwald – sports anchor (1978–1985)
- Ricki Wertz – children's television show host (1958–1982)
- Sally Wiggin – anchor/reporter (1980–2018)

=== Wendy Bell controversy ===
WTAE news anchor Wendy Bell was fired in March 2016 after posting comments following the 2016 Wilkinsburg shooting, including: "You needn't be a criminal profiler to draw a mental sketch of the killers who broke so many hearts two weeks ago Wednesday... they are young black men." WTAE-TV's president and general manager publicly apologized for the incident on air. Two black males were arrested and charged, but not convicted of the murders. Bell sued her former employer, Hearst Communications, claiming "she wouldn't have been fired for her comments if she were not white". The terms of an out-of-court settlement were not disclosed, though Bell said she "was satisfied". Bell has since become a conservative talk radio host with runs at KDKA and WJAS, expressing skepticism regarding COVID-19 vaccinations and the validity of the 2020 presidential election.

== Technical information ==
=== Subchannels ===
The station's signal is multiplexed:

Subchannels of WTAE-TV
| Subchannel | Res. | Short name | Programming |
|---|---|---|---|
| 4.1 | 1080i | WTAE | ABC |
| 4.2 | 480i | Cozi TV | Cozi TV |
| 4.3 | 480i | STORY | Story Television |
| 22.2 | 480i | TheNest | The Nest (WPNT) |
| 22.3 | 480i | Comet | Comet (WPNT) |
| 22.4 | 480i | TBD | Roar (WPNT) |

Broadcast on behalf of another station

On August 3, 2009, WTAE-TV converted its traffic/weather subchannel into a This TV affiliate.

WTAE-TV is among a handful of ABC-affiliated stations and one of five Hearst-owned ABC affiliates (the other four are WCVB-TV in Boston, WMUR-TV in Manchester, New Hampshire, KMBC-TV in Kansas City and KETV in Omaha) that broadcast their HDTV signals in 1080i rather than the 720p format of most other ABC stations, which allows the station's weather graphics and local advertising (often filmed in 1080i or 1080p) to be carried in a native format without a step of downscaling.

On January 1, 2018, WTAE-TV replaced This on WTAE-DT2 with Cozi TV upon the end of Hearst's carriage agreement with parent Tribune Broadcasting for that network.

=== Analog-to-digital conversion ===
WTAE-TV signed on its high-definition digital signal on December 3, 1998. WTAE-TV ended regular programming on its analog signal, over VHF channel 4, on June 12, 2009, the official date on which full-power television stations in the United States transitioned from analog to digital broadcasts under federal mandate. The station's digital signal continued to broadcast on its pre-transition UHF channel 51, using virtual channel 4.

As part of the SAFER Act, WTAE kept its analog signal on the air until July 12 to inform viewers of the digital television transition through a loop of public service announcements from the National Association of Broadcasters.

WTAE-TV operates a 15-kilowatt digital broadcast translator on channel 22 to cover portions of the northern Pittsburgh area which were unable to receive channel 4's digital signal. WTAE-TV had to wait for WPMY, which had been operating in analog nightlight mode after terminating regular programming on analog UHF channel 22 on the original February 17 deadline, to leave the channel entirely on March 19 before operating it.

=== Translator ===
WTAE-TV (DRT) 22 Pittsburgh

== Out-of-market coverage ==
At various times, WTAE-TV has also served as the default ABC affiliate for the neighboring Johnstown–Altoona, Wheeling–Steubenville, and Clarksburg–Weston television markets (all of which could receive WTAE-TV as a grade B signal). With WTAE-TV having long been one of ABC's strongest affiliates, both ABC and Hearst reportedly resisted efforts by other television stations in those cities to obtain a full-time ABC affiliation. Since then, one station was eventually granted affiliation in Altoona (WATM-TV), while WBOY-TV in Clarksburg and WTRF-TV in Wheeling began carrying ABC programs through digital subchannel affiliations in August 2008 on WBOY-DT2 (Your ABC) and WTRF-DT3 (ABC Ohio Valley), respectively. WTAE-TV remains available on cable in all three markets. In addition to those areas, WTAE-TV can also be seen on several out-of-market cable systems throughout northwestern and central Pennsylvania, and several locations in eastern and northeast Ohio.
