= WQED (TV) =

Television station in Pittsburgh

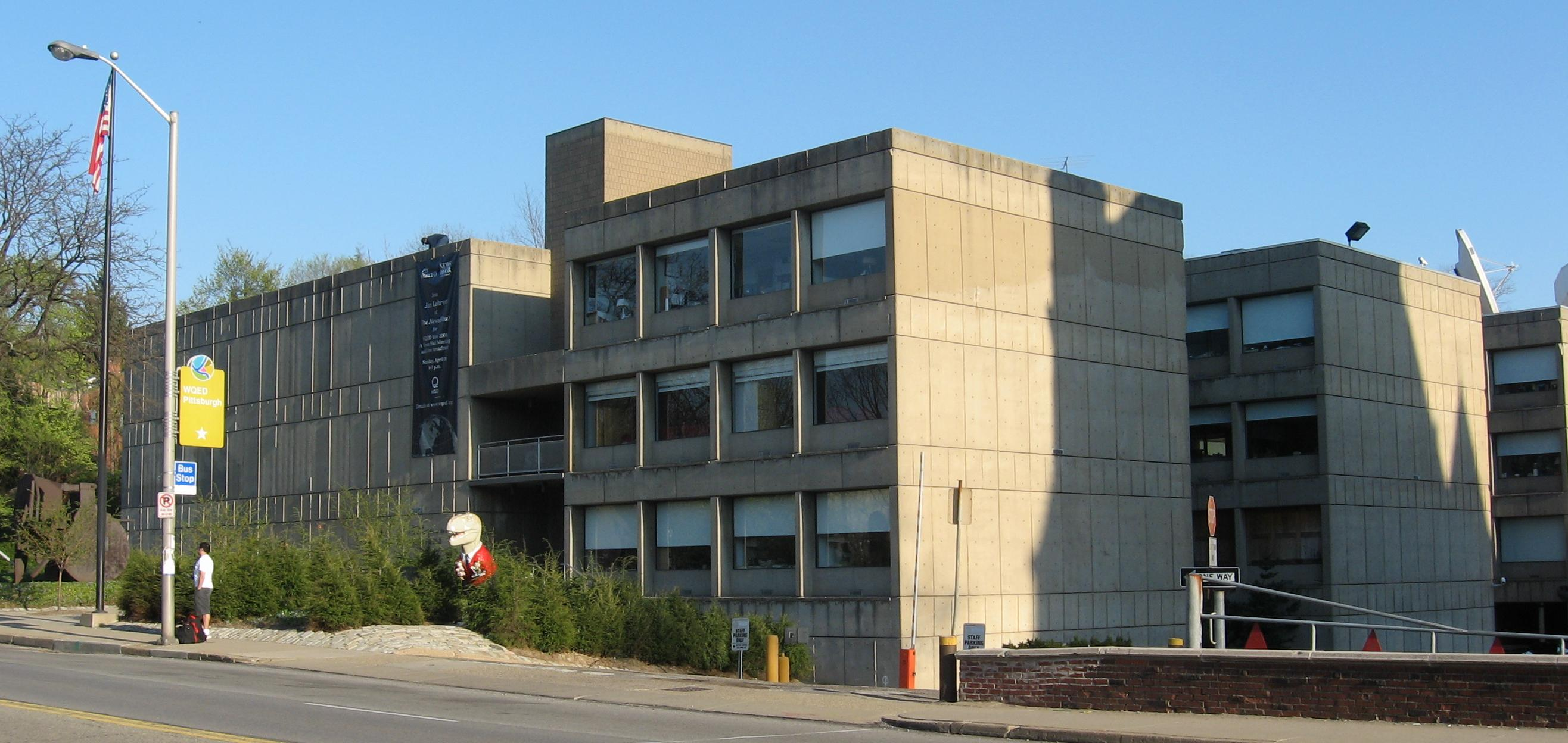
- WQED headquarters, next to Central Catholic High School in Pittsburgh
- Pittsburgh, Pennsylvania; United States
- Channels: Digital: 4 (VHF); Virtual: 13
- Branding: WQED

Programming
- Affiliations: 13.1: PBS; for others, see § Subchannels

Ownership
- Owner: WQED Multimedia
- Sister stations: Radio: WQED-FM

History
- First air date: April 1, 1954
- Former channel numbers: Analog: 13 (VHF, 1954–2009); Digital: 38 (UHF, 1999–2009), 13 (VHF, 2009–2019)
- Former affiliations: NET (1954–1970)
- Call sign meaning: Quod erat demonstrandum ("What has been shown")

Technical information
- Licensing authority: FCC
- Facility ID: 41315
- ERP: 35 kW
- HAAT: 218.3 m (716 ft)
- Transmitter coordinates: 40°26′46.2″N 79°57′50.2″W
- Translator(s): WBPA-LD 12 (VHF) Pittsburgh

Links
- Public license information: Public file; LMS
- Website: www.wqed.org

WQED (channel 13) is a PBS member television station in Pittsburgh, Pennsylvania, United States. Owned by WQED Multimedia, it is sister to public radio station WQED-FM (89.3). The two outlets share studios on Fifth Avenue near the Carnegie Mellon University campus and transmitter facilities near the campus of the University of Pittsburgh, both in the city's Oakland section.

Established on April 1, 1954, WQED was the first community-sponsored television station in the U.S. and the country's fifth public television station. It was the first station to telecast classes to elementary school classrooms when Pittsburgh launched its Metropolitan School Service in 1955. The station has been the flagship for the shows Mister Rogers' Neighborhood, Once Upon A Classic, Where in the World Is Carmen Sandiego? (a co-production with Boston's WGBH-TV; filmed in New York City), and Daniel Tiger's Neighborhood (whose live-action scenes are filmed in Pittsburgh).

== History ==
A public television station was the brainchild of Pittsburgh mayor David L. Lawrence, who wanted 12 percent of U.S. TV stations licensed for non-commercial educational use. Despite the Federal Communications Commission (FCC) putting an indefinite freeze on new TV station licenses (due to the number of applications on file), the commission granted Lawrence a license if he could raise money to equip and operate the station. Lawrence, a friend of President Harry S. Truman, recruited Pittsburgh Plate Glass Company attorney Leland Hazard to help get the station off the ground.

Sculpture outside WQED headquarters

Its greatest obstacle was Pittsburgh-based Westinghouse Electric Corporation, owners of radio station KDKA. Westinghouse wanted a TV station in the city to compete with the DuMont-owned-and-operated WDTV (which had a de facto monopoly in the nation's sixth-largest television market), and was impatient with the freeze on new licenses. Although the corporation launched WBZ-TV in Boston in 1948 and purchased Philadelphia's WPTZ-TV (now KYW-TV) in 1952, it was unable to secure a TV-station license in its home market. When the freeze was lifted in 1952, the FCC granted station licenses to smaller cities (such as Steubenville and Youngstown, Ohio; Wheeling and Clarksburg, West Virginia, and Johnstown, Altoona and Erie, Pennsylvania) before granting more licenses in Pittsburgh. All those cities shared the VHF band with Pittsburgh, and only Youngstown would end up as a UHF island.

WQED title card

Westinghouse presented a compromise to the FCC, offering to share its proposed KDKA-TV with WQED on channel 13. Hazard found this unacceptable, and asked Westinghouse CEO Gwilym Price if he should give up his quest for public television. Price said that Hazard should keep fighting, promising Westinghouse support for WQED. Westinghouse donated the tower it had purchased for the channel 13 license, enabling WQED to begin operations on April 1, 1954. The station's call letters are from the Latin phrase quod erat demonstrandum ("what was demonstrated"), commonly used in mathematics.

Westinghouse soon had its Pittsburgh TV station. Knowing that DuMont needed WDTV's cash flow to get its programming cleared in larger markets and a short-term cash infusion after DuMont investor Paramount Pictures vetoed a merger between DuMont and ABC, Westinghouse offered DuMont $10 million for WDTV in January 1955. It changed the station's call sign to KDKA-TV, making it a sister station of KDKA radio. DuMont, unable to obtain clearance in larger markets, was out of business by the end of 1956. Although KDKA-TV is now owned by Westinghouse successor Paramount Skydance, the station retains a close relationship with WQED.

WQED briefly shared channel 13 with WENS-TV in 1955, after a storm damaged the WENS-TV tower in Reserve Township, until the WENS-TV tower was repaired. WQED acquired the station and renamed it WQEX in 1959, using the construction permit it had acquired for channel 22 to launch WQEX on channel 16. The Commercial Radio Institute acquired the WENS-TV permit for channel 22, launching WPTT (now WPNT) in 1978.

The station was briefly affiliated with the NTA Film Network during the late 1950s, sharing the affiliation with KDKA-TV, WTAE-TV, and WIIC-TV (now WPXI). From sign-on until its replacement by PBS in 1970, WQED was a National Educational Television member station.

During its heyday in the 1970s and 1980s, WQED supplied programming to PBS. For 15 years, WQED produced the National Geographic specials for the National Geographic Society. The programs won several Emmy and other awards, including Peabody Awards.

Actor Michael Keaton, who worked behind the scenes on Mister Rogers' Neighborhood, went on to international fame. During its heyday, WQED supported a post-production office and editing facility in Los Angeles. Known as QED/West, the satellite edited much of WQED's national programming.

During the early 1990s, WQED faltered, as did many other PBS stations across the country, as the rapidly-changing media landscape shifted. The downturn was exacerbated by a scandal in which top executives were discovered to have been augmenting their income without informing the board of directors. The period was chronicled in Jerold Starr's 2000 book, Air Wars: The Fight to Reclaim Public Broadcasting.

Problems continued with a failed attempt to sell WQED's auxiliary station, WQEX, in 1999. In 2002, WQEX's non-commercial educational status was removed; the station moved to a shopping format, first with America's Store and later with ShopNBC; that in effect made WQEX a for-profit arm to generate revenue for channel 13. In November 2010, WQED agreed to sell WQEX to Ion Media Networks for $3 million. The sale was completed (after FCC approval) on May 2, 2011, when the station's call sign changed from WQEX to WINP-TV. WQED received $9.9 million in a 2017 spectrum auction, and would use the proceeds to pay down debt the station has carried since the 1990s.

The Fred Rogers Studio, where Fred Rogers recorded his iconic television series Mister Rogers' Neighborhood, is featured in the film A Beautiful Day in the Neighborhood with Tom Hanks playing Rogers. The cast and crew shot at the WQED headquarters throughout October 2018.

== Original programming ==
=== Local ===
- Black Horizons (1968–present) – weekly as the longest running African-American issues program in the nation.
- QED Cooks (1993–present) – Chris Fennimore and Nancy Polinsky Johnson celebrates and cooks the delicious food culture of Pittsburgh, and talks about heritage and the tradition of passing down recipes to the next generation.

=== National ===
- Mister Rogers' Neighborhood (1968–2001) – in association with Family Communications
- Drink, Drank, Drunk (1974) – an hour-long program on alcoholism, hosted by Carol Burnett
- National Geographic Specials (1975–1991)
- Puzzle Children (1976) – an hour-long Julie Andrews and Bill Bixby-hosted special
- Once Upon a Classic (1976–1980) - a show hosted by Bill Bixby that introduced literary works acted out for young viewers in a way easily understandable
- Including Me (1977) – an hour-long Patricia Neal-hosted program spotlighting six disabled children
- Raised in Anger (1979) – an hour-long Ed Asner-hosted program on child abuse
- The Chemical People (1982–1983) – a nine-part series on drug abuse
- Planet Earth (1986) – in association with the National Academy of Sciences
- Zoobilee Zoo (1986–1987) - also aired nationally in syndication
- The Infinite Voyage (1987–1992) – in association with the National Academy of Sciences
- Where in the World Is Carmen Sandiego? (1991–1995) – in partnership with WGBH-TV in Boston
- The first America Speaks with Bill Clinton, aired nationally by NBC (June 1992)
- Where in Time Is Carmen Sandiego? (1996–1997) – in partnership with WGBH-TV in Boston
- Space Age (1994?) – in association with the National Academy of Sciences
- The Fox Cubhouse (1994–1996) – aired nationally by Fox
- Doo Wop 50 (1999), and subsequent similar programs produced by TJ Lubinsky
- The War that Made America (2006)

== Technical information ==
=== Subchannels ===
The station's signal is multiplexed:

Subchannels of WQED and WBPA-LD
| Subchannel | Res. | Short name | Programming |
|---|---|---|---|
| 13.1 | 1080i | WQED-HD | PBS |
| 13.2 | 480i | CREATE | Create |
| 13.3 | 480i | WORLD | World |
| 13.4 | 480i | SHOW | Showcase |
| 13.5 | 480i | KIDS | PBS Kids |

On January 5, 2009, WQED launched Create on 13.2, replacing the standard-definition simulcast of WQED's main channel.

=== Analog-to-digital conversion ===
WQED shut down its analog signal on VHF channel 13 on June 12, 2009, when full-power television stations in the United States transitioned from analog to digital broadcasts by federal mandate. The station's digital signal relocated from its pre-transition UHF channel 38 to VHF channel 13. WQED was the only full-power station in the Pittsburgh market to move its digital signal back to its analog-era channel. Former sister station WINP-TV took over WQED's former digital channel 38, broadcasting on virtual channel 16.1.

On June 27, 2019, at 8 a.m. during the FCC repack, WQED relocated from channel 13 to channel 4. While the repack did help WQED pay down its decades-long debt significantly, the low end of the VHF band has proven to be problematic with digital signals and as a result, WQED is effectively operating as a de-facto low-power station despite having a full-power license and broadcasting as such. Additionally, WQED has yet to take up on an offer from Sinclair Broadcast Group (owner of WPGH-TV and WPNT) for free hosting on WPNT's ATSC 3.0 signal, which Sinclair has offered for PBS stations that have not launched their own ATSC 3.0 signal.

As of April 2025, WQED was waiting on the FCC and a Christian broadcaster in Ohio (later revealed to be WLMA in Lima) to sign off on WQED to increase its power. The FCC approved the request on June 18, increasing WQED's broadcasting power from 10 kW to 35 kW; WLMA was allowed to increase its power as well. The FCC determined that any signal interference between the two stations was minimal and the area where there would be interference (near Wooster, Ohio, which is within the Cleveland DMA) was well outside both stations' primary viewing areas anyways.

=== Translators ===
On October 23, 2025, it was announced that WQED would start simulcasting its programming on low-power station WBPA-LD, which broadcasts on RF channel 12. Both WQED and WBPA-LD share the same transmitting tower. The same digital channels that are available on WQED's main frequency are also carried on the co-located translator. According to the FCC's website, the WBPA-LD translator transmits at a power of 3 kW.

== See also ==
- WINP-TV
