= Ragtag Productions =

Ragtag Productions is an American independent film and video production company based in Astoria, Queens. They are noted for the web comedy series We Need Girlfriends that ran in 2006–2007. The company entered into discussions with CBS about turning We Need Girlfriends into a television series pilot with Sex and the City creator Darren Star. After premiering the first episode in August 2010 at The Feel Good Film Festival founded by Kristen Ridgway Flores, their newest project My Future Girlfriend debuted online on April 1, 2011.

== Background ==
Company founders Steven Tsapelas, Brian Amyot and Angel Acevedo were film majors at Hofstra University in Long Island, New York, where they met. Upon graduation, the three moved to Astoria to work together producing film shorts and submitting them to festivals. After seeing the increasing popularity of online film submissions and contest, they decided to focus on the Internet as a medium to distribute their work.

== Filmography ==
- We Need Girlfriends - 2006–2007
- I Live With My Parents - 2009
- My Future Girlfriend - 2011
