= It's Elementary (disambiguation) =

It's Elementary: Talking About Gay Issues in School is a 1996 documentary film.

It's Elementary may also refer to:

- "It's Elementary", a 2007 work by Robert Winston, Baron Winston
- "It's Elementary My Dear Pup Club", a 2013 episode of Pound Puppies
