= Flyway Film Festival =

Coordinates: 44°26′23.8″N 92°08′49.9″W

The Flyway Film Festival was an annual independent film festival along the shores of Lake Pepin in Wisconsin and Minnesota, United States, held in October. It was founded in 2008 by Rick Vaicius in Pepin, Wisconsin, and expanded to include screenings in Stockholm and Alma, Wisconsin and Red Wing and Wabasha, Minnesota.

In 2017, Rick Vaicius, Flyway's longtime executive director, departed the organization. A new non-profit and board were established to carry the organization forward.

This non-profit, the Flyway Film Society, relaunched the film festival in 2018 under the guidance of interim director Lu Lippold.

It has been on hiatus since 2019.

== History ==
Started in 2008, the Flyway Film Festival screens both short and feature-length films, dramatic, comedic and documentary. Screenings were held at the Lake Pepin Art & Design Gallery 2008 and the Widespot Performing Arts Center in the Historic Stockholm Opera Hall beginning in 2009.

In 2012 the festival started to use the new technique of crowd-funding to raise the funds for the 2012 festival. The festival hoped to raise $10,000 to cover the travel expenses of 120 film-makers and film experts. They reached their goal that September.

The 2008 Flyway Film Festival included notable films such as Speedy Delivery and Older Than America, an American Indian horror film that premiered at the 2006 Cannes Film Festival and the 2006 Sundance Film Festival. It was produced by Christine Walker, who also line produced American Splendor, and whose recognitions include a Producers Guild of America Diversity Award and the Sundance Producer's Institute Fellowship Award.

The 2009 Flyway Film Festival debuted the International Zombie Summit, a genre-specific event of classic and cutting-edge independent zombie films, including Dead Snow, Colin, and Redneck Zombies, while standard programming in 2009 included the Dutch drama The Storm, which was much praised at the Berlin International Film Festival; and Francesco Quinn in the short The Gnostic.

In 2013 the 50 films screened included The Rocket and A Field in England.
