= Angel Acevedo =

American filmmaker (born 1982)

- Born: July 26, 1982; Chicago, Illinois, U.S.

Angel Acevedo (born July 26, 1982) is an American filmmaker.

== Biography ==
Acevedo attended Hofstra University, where he earned a bachelor's degree in film studies and production and won Best Screenplay for his thesis film Cheesecake. While at Hofstra, he met Brian Amyot and Steven Tsapelas, and in 2004 they formed Ragtag Productions.

Acevedo is one of the driving forces behind We Need Girlfriends series, filming most of the scenes and the character of Rod is loosely based on him.
