= Speedy Delivery =

- Directed by: Paul B. Germain
- Produced by: Paul B. Germain; Stuart Friedel
- Starring: David Newell; Fred Rogers
- Cinematography: Paul B. Germain; Stuart Friedel
- Edited by: Paul B. Germain
- Music by: Bryan Senti
- Release date: April 10, 2008 (Pittsburgh)
- Running time: 72 minutes
- Language: English
- Budget: $4,000

Speedy Delivery is a 2008 documentary film directed and produced by Paul B. Germain. The film follows the life story of David Newell, better known as Mr. McFeely from the children's television show Mister Rogers' Neighborhood. This was released two months after the series' 40th anniversary. Speedy Delivery is the first film about Mister Rogers.

Shot in Pittsburgh, Pennsylvania, the film is a character study of Newell, examining his mission to help save "The Neighborhood" following the death of his close friend Fred Rogers. Made on a budget of $4,000, it was funded by grants from two universities: Carnegie Mellon University and Pomona College. It aired regionally on PBS and was screened at The Feel Good Film Festival founded by Kristen Ridgway Flores, Flyway Film Festival, and the 2009 Seattle Children's Film Festival.

== Plot ==
Speedy Delivery follows David Newell/Mr. McFeely around his own neighborhood, Pittsburgh, Pennsylvania, examining the two roles he has played for over forty years. Intercut with retrospective interviews, the film explores Newell's life of service, as both playing the character Mr. McFeely and as director of public relations for Family Communications, Inc., the parent company founded by Fred Rogers. This company created and produced Mister Rogers' Neighborhood during the majority of its years on air since its debut in 1967.

The film follows Newell on four appearances located in Pennsylvania and Maryland. Beginning in Pittsburgh, he appears at the opening of the Schenley Plaza Carousel, meeting and greeting with fans. Next, he travels to Baltimore, Maryland to help open up a special Mister Rogers traveling exhibit, including a replica of the set. Finally, he returns to Pittsburgh for two more appearances in Bridgeville, Pennsylvania and Cranberry Park. All along the way, the film uses retrospective interviews with former cast members and current co-workers to discuss topics like Newell's childhood, the passing of Fred Rogers, where the character Mr. McFeely came from and what kept Mister Rogers' Neighborhood successful and authentic for over four decades.

== Alternate versions ==
There are two cuts of Speedy Delivery. The theatrical cut runs approximately one hour and twelve minutes. The television cut runs approximately fifty-seven minutes, standard for PBS specifications. The theatrical cut is available on DVD and includes a director's commentary.

== On television ==
Speedy Delivery aired regionally on PBS stations across the nation.
