= List of Pound Puppies (2010 TV series) episodes =

The following is a list of episodes from The Hub original series Pound Puppies. During the course of the series, 65 episodes of Pound Puppies aired over three seasons.

== Series overview ==
Season	Episodes	Originally released	
Season	Episodes	First released	Last released
1	26	October 10, 2010	January 28, 2012
2	13	June 2, 2012	December 1, 2012
3	26	June 1, 2013	November 16, 2013

== Episodes ==
=== Season 1 (2010–12) ===
The first seven episodes were directed by Richard Weston; the rest of the season has varying directors.

No.	Title	Directed by	Written by	Original U.S. air date	Original CAN. air date	Prod. code
1	"The Yipper Caper"	Richard Weston	Paul Germain & Joe Ansolabehere	October 10, 2010	October 12, 2010	101
A so-called "unmatchable puppy" named Yipper finds the perfect match and then loses him. Meanwhile, McLeish attempts to impress his brother-in-law, the mayor (Dabney Coleman). Puppy: Yipper (Danny Cooksey).
2	"A Nightmare on Pound Street"	Richard Weston	Bart Jennett & Joe Ansolabehere	October 29, 2010	February 10, 2011	102
In a Halloween-themed episode., the puppies try to find a home for a weird-looking puppy named Freddie (Justin Shenkarow). Puppy: Freddie; Note: The title of the episode is a reference to the horror film franchise A Nightmare on Elm Street.
3	"The Rebound"	Richard Weston	Mark Drop & Bart Jennett	November 5, 2010	January 27, 2011	103
The puppies seek a home for a hyperactive puppy named Rebound (Brooke Goldner), but it becomes an exhausting task when each owner returns her just minutes after adoption and Niblet knows why, as he has a connection with her. Meanwhile, Mr. McLeish's mother (Betty White) comes to visit the pound. Puppy: Rebound
4	"The General"	Richard Weston	Rachel Lipman	November 19, 2010	February 17, 2011	104
The General Dolly (E. G. Daily), a legendary canine in the Pound Puppies community, visits the shelter, and - much to the gang's surprise - is revealed to be a female Poodle. She tells them that she has 67 puppies that need to be adopted. Meanwhile, Cookie tries to connect more with her feminine side after realizing that the team thinks of her as just "one of the guys". Cookie also reveals that she has a crush on Lucky. Puppy: Puppies disguised as a brown puppy.
5	"The Prince and the Pupper"	Richard Weston	Bart Jennett	December 3, 2010	February 8, 2011	105
Tired of being unappreciated, Squirt switches places with a rich lookalike named Cuddlesworth (Ted Biaselli), who desires to become a Pound Puppy. While Cuddlesworth realizes that being a Pound Puppy is not as fun as he thought, his servant (Charles Shaughnessy) takes Squirt to a mansion, where he meets a cat named Madame Pickypuss (Tress MacNeille). Puppy: Cuddlesworth, Squirt, and MacGuffin
6	"The Catcalls"	Richard Weston	Eric Trueheart	December 17, 2010	January 20, 2011	106
The Pound Puppies and Kennel Kittens try to get a puppy and kitten adopted by the same home, in which the father dislikes cats and the mother dislikes dogs. Puppy: Wagster (temporarily named Patches) (Tara Strong); Kitten: Mittens (temporarily named Stripe) (E. G. Daily)
7	"The King of the Heap"	Richard Weston	Rich Fogel	December 24, 2010	December 30, 2010	107
A Rottweiler named Tyson (Clancy Brown) wishes to get adopted by the owner of the junkyard, but the junkyard owner adopts Niblet instead. Puppy: Tyson Note: This was the last episode animated by 9 Story Media Group and directed by Richard Weston.
8	"My Fair Rebound"	Greg Sullivan	Rachel Lipman	August 13, 2011	Unknown	108
Ms. McLeish wants to enter Rebound in a dog show to show up a rival, Mildred (Katherine Helmond), and her upper class canine, Sterling Von Oxnard (Clancy Brown). Rebound seeks help from the Pound Puppies to help her become a proper contestant, while Mrs. McLeish seeks the help of famed dog trainer Mr. Julius (George Takei). Puppy: Rebound Note: From this episode onward, the animation for the series is produced by DHX Media Vancouver, marking a noticeable change in the series animation style.
9	"The Quintuplets"	Jos Humphrey	Joe Ansolabehere	August 13, 2011	February 1, 2011	109
The Pound Puppies try to get quintuplets adopted, but this becomes a problem when they learn that all five want to be adopted together. Puppy: The Quintuplets (Whip and Tip are voiced by E. G. Daily, while Flip and Blip are voiced by Kath Soucie).
10	"A Dog on a Wire"	Greg Sullivan	Eric Trueheart	August 20, 2011	February 3, 2011	110
Tired of being left behind on missions because of her shape, Strudel gets her chance to shine when she is tasked with guiding a circus dog named Chuckles (Tom Kenny) back to his home. Reaching the big top, she becomes part of a circus act that must succeed to prevent a greedy ringmaster (Kevin Michael Richardson) from canceling it for good. Strudel must soon choose between a life of stardom and her friends back at the pound, before the fame goes to her head. Puppy: Chuckles, later Strudel
11	"The Homeward Pound"	Jos Humphrey	Billiam Coronel	August 27, 2011	Unknown	111
After a successful mission at a local airport, Squirt and Niblet stumble into a departing plane. Landing in Canada, they have to find their way back. Their friends back home call upon the rest of the Pound Puppy network, including Canadian pup agents Todd (Dave Thomas) and Rick (Dave Foley), to pinpoint their exact location. Puppy: Dinky (Lauren Tom), later Squirt and Niblet
12	"The Rebel Without a Collar"	Greg Sullivan	Rachel Lipman	September 10, 2011	Unknown	112
Cookie develops a crush on a coyote named Fang (Luke Perry) and she considers leaving the pound with him. Meanwhile, it is hinted that Lucky has a crush on Cookie. Puppy: Buddy (Richard Lewis)
13	"The Taboo"	Jos Humphrey	Julie Selbo	October 1, 2011	Unknown	113
The Pound Puppies believe that a puppy, named Taboo (Pamela Adlon), brings bad luck. Puppy: Taboo
14	"Toyoshiko! Bark Friend Machine"	Greg Sullivan	Mark Drop	October 8, 2011	Unknown	114
Milton Feltwaddle (Jim Parsons) brings a super-intelligent robot dog named Toyoshiko (Ashley Johnson) to the pound, who understands Strudel. Puppy: Toyoshiko
15	"The Zoltron"	Jos Humphrey	Silvia Olivas	October 15, 2011	Unknown	115
After Zoltron (French Stewart) gets separated from his family during an outing, he needs help from the Pound Puppies to be reunited with his people, and the pups soon make the discovery that their new companion may or may not be from planet Earth. Puppy: Zoltron
16	"The Really Weird Dog"	Greg Sullivan	Steven Tsapelas	October 22, 2011	Unknown	116
Lucky wants to help Rover (Sam McMurray) find his person, but finds out that Rover is not an ordinary dog, but rather an alligator. Puppy: Rover
17	"Bone Voyage"	Jos Humphrey	Tony Infante	November 12, 2011	Unknown	117
When Mrs. McLeish leaves for a vacation on a cruise, Rebound believes she will never come back. Meanwhile, the cruise ship's captain (Gavin Macleod) becomes smitten with Mrs. McLeish. Puppy: Greasy (Kath Soucie), later Rebound
18	"The Snow Problem"	Greg Sullivan	Rich Fogel	November 19, 2011	Unknown	118
The Pound Puppies become sled dogs to help Tundra (Hunter Parrish), a Siberian Husky, impress the person of his dreams, dog musher Jean Luc Glaciaire (Maurice LaMarche). Puppy: Tundra
19	"The K9 Kid"	Jos Humphrey	Mike Ferris	November 26, 2011	Unknown	119
Lucky and the gang meet Pepper (Jennifer Carpenter), who is determined to become a cop dog, even though she is not the right size or breed for the job. Puppy: Pepper
20	"The Call of the Squirreldog"	Greg Sullivan	Nancy Steingard	December 3, 2011	Unknown	120
Squirt tells the story of how Mr. Nut Nut joined the Pound Puppies crew. Puppy: Chocko (Pamela Adlon), Scout (E. G. Daily), and Winnie (Cree Summer)
21	"I Never Barked for My Father"	Jos Humphrey	Joe Ansolabehere	December 10, 2011	Unknown	121
Lucky's father, Slick (Gary Cole), comes to the pound to hide from the dog catcher. Lucky, however, is angry at his father for leaving him when he was a puppy. Puppy: Chip (Danny Cooksey) Note: In August 2012, this episode was honored with the Humanitas Prize for excellence in writing for children's television animation.
22	"The McLeash Unleashed"	Greg Sullivan	Eric Trueheart	December 17, 2011	Unknown	122
Milton Feltwaddle returns to run Shelter 17 when McLeish gets an exciting promotion, and the gang soon realizes that placing pups in homes will become a challenge as soon as they realize that the new leader means serious business. Feltwaddle reveals to be incompetent on running a pound and treats it more like a prison and believes that dogs should look like their owners. Puppy: Corky (Georgina Cordova)
23	"Olaf in Love"	Jos Humphrey	Peter Hannan	January 7, 2012	Unknown	123
A new puppy, Kiki (Jentle Phoenix), believes that she has found the perfect person in Olaf and Gertrude the librarian (Ellen Greene), so it is up to the Pound Puppies use their imagination to get the two to realize that they are made for each other and get the new dog a forever home. Puppy: Kiki Note: One of the songs used in this episode was an instrumental version of the "Cutie Mark Crusaders Song" (first used on My Little Pony: Friendship Is Magic).
24	"The Kennel Kittens Return"	Greg Sullivan	Tony Infante	January 14, 2012	Unknown	124
Squirt, disguised as a cat, sneaks into the Kennel Kittens' headquarters to retrieve a gadget they stole from the Pound Puppies. Kitten: Lily (Tara Strong)
25	"The Mutternal Instincts"	Jos Humphrey	Janna King	January 21, 2012	Unknown	125
Cookie has been feeling ignored due to her family's busy schedules and becomes close to a puppy she names Cupcake (Cree Summer). Puppy: Cupcake
26	"Lucky Gets Adopted"	Greg Sullivan	Bart Jennett	January 28, 2012	Unknown	126
Lucky is adopted against his will by an eccentric social outcast named Dot (Grey DeLisle), but his new owner's over-affectionate ways make him uncomfortable. Puppy: Shaggles, later Lucky Note: This is the first episode to feature singing, something that would later occur in music starting with season 2.

=== Season 2 (2012) ===
The second season premiered on June 2, 2012.

This season introduced the Super Secret Pup Club, Rebound, Cupcake, and (new for season 2) Patches. In addition, Rebound, Cupcake and Patches are featured in the opening theme during the second season giving tags to the puppies going to their new homes.

All but six episodes of this season were directed by Jos Humphrey; the other six episodes of this season (28, 30, 32, 34-35, and 38) were directed by Greg Sullivan.

No.	Title	Written by	Original U.S. air date	Original CAN. air date	Prod. code
27	"Zipper the Zoomit Dog"	Mark Drop	June 2, 2012	September 7, 2012	201
Squirt reveals his secret past and vows to train Zipper (Tara Strong) to catch flying discs, secretly to get revenge on a dog from his past named Brutus (John J. York). Puppy: Zipper
28	"The Fraud Princess"	Rachel Lipman	June 9, 2012	September 14, 2012	202
Agatha's new beau, Wally Banks (Tim Conway), brings a nosey playmate over for Rebound. Puppy: Princess (Dom Irrera)
29	"The Super Secret Pup Club"	Bart Jennett	June 16, 2012	September 21, 2012	203
After being told they are too little to join the Pound Puppies, Rebound and Cupcake join a Dalmatian puppy named Patches (Jessica DiCicco) to form their own puppy-placing group. Puppy: Patches
30	"Barlow"	Alan Hanson	June 23, 2012	September 28, 2012	204
An old Basset Hound dog named Barlow promotes a philosophy of laziness, which is easily embraced by the others at the pound, except for Lucky, who tries to find Barlow's banjo-playing person (Diedrich Bader). Meanwhile, the legendary Dash Whippet (Corey Burton) pays the Pound Puppies a visit and expects them to find people for his grand-pups. Puppy: Zippster (Cree Summer), Kippster (Jessica DiCicco), Tip-Tip (E. G. Daily), and Barlow
31	"There's Something About Camelia"	Tony Infante	June 30, 2012	October 5, 2012	205
A dog named Camelia (E. G. Daily) matches well with many people, so the puppies try to find her best match. Puppy: Poopsie and Camelia
32	"Good Dog, McLeish!"	Evan Gore	July 7, 2012	October 12, 2012	206
McLeish is accidentally hypnotized into thinking he is a dog. He joins the Pound Puppies on a mission to take Piper (Anndi McAfee) to her person at a pound run by McLeish's old friend Ralphie (Wayne Knight) in Milwaukee, Wisconsin. Puppy: Piper
33	"The Ruff Ruff Bunch"	Rich Fogel	July 14, 2012	October 19, 2012	208
The Super Secret Pup Club join a high society dog club, while the Pound Puppies search for the lost dog Cuddlesworth. Puppy: Cuddlesworth and Rebound
34	"Salty"	Merriwether Williams	July 21, 2012	October 26, 2012	209
Salty (Clancy Brown), an aging sea dog, tries to choose his own replacement. Puppy: Suds (Rob Paulsen) and Salty
35	"Squawk"	Chelsea Meyer	July 28, 2012	November 2, 2012	207
Niblet shares the Pound Puppies' secrets with a chatty parrot (Frank Welker), that McLeish is watching for his brother-in-law, the mayor (John Larroquette). Puppy: Humphrey (Danny Cooksey)
36	"The Accidental Pup Star"	Tony Infante	August 25, 2012	November 9, 2012	212
Rebound's song-and-dance skills are on display in a video on the Internet, and the Pound Puppies try to prevent McLeish from exploiting this for fame. Puppy: Roxie
37	"No Dogs Allowed"	Richard Whitley	September 1, 2012	November 16, 2012	210
The Pound Puppies investigate why people are returning their pups to the pound and find that the landlord of an apartment (Kevin Michael Richardson) has a no-dogs-allowed policy. Puppy: Checkers (Kath Soucie)
38	"I Heard the Barks on Christmas Eve"	Chelsea Meyer	November 24, 2012	November 30, 2012	213
The Pound Puppies need a miracle to place thousands of puppies that are overflowing from shelters all over town. The task seems insurmountable, but Rebound's tenacity may be just enough to pull off a Christmas miracle. Puppy: Nutmeg (Tara Strong) and Ralph (Fred Stoller)
39	"Pound Preemies"	Eric Trueheart	December 1, 2012	September 18, 2012	211
A dog named Miss Petunia (Glenne Headly) gives premature birth to a litter of puppies at Shelter 17, who are mistakenly adopted by a trio of girls. The Pound Puppies must find the newborns and get them back to their mother. Puppy: Newborn puppies (including Cinnamon (U.S.)/Velvet Belly (Canada), "Runt" in the credits)

=== Season 3 (2013) ===
The third season premiered on June 1, 2013, consisting of 26 episodes. Tim Stuby directed with Jos Humphrey and Greg Sullivan in Season 3.

No.	Title	Directed by	Written by	Original U.S. air date	Original CAN. air date	Prod. code
40	"Working K-9 to 5"	Jos Humphrey	Stephen Cedars	June 1, 2013	TBA	301
Dolores (Tara Strong) has to prove to her editor in chief dad (J. K. Simmons) that she is responsible enough to adopt a pup, so she becomes a delivery girl for his newspaper. The Pound Puppies investigate why her deliveries are so late, so they can match her to her perfect pup. Puppy: Dimples (E. G. Daily)
41	"Cuddle Up Buttercup"	Greg Sullivan & Tim Stuby	Chelsea Meyer	June 1, 2013	November 7, 2013	302
An adorable pup named Buttercup (Grey DeLisle) looks so much like the latest toy sensation, Cuddle Up Buttercup, that kids think that she is the toy come to life. The Pound Puppies scramble to find her perfect person before she gets nabbed. Puppy: Buttercup
42	"The Pups Who Loved Me"	Jos Humphrey	Bart Jennett	June 8, 2013	November 11, 2013	303
British Pound Puppy agent Bondo (Jeff Bennett) arrives at Shelter 17 in his flying car. While playing in the car, the Super Secret Pup Club set off the controls and fly to London. Lucky and Bondo team to find them and place pup Yakov (Rob Paulsen) with his perfect person. Puppy: Yakov
43	"Fright at the Museum"	Greg Sullivan & Tim Stuby	Tony Infante	June 15, 2013	November 12, 2013	304
The Pound Puppies sneak into a museum to place pup Millie (Jeannie Elias) with Amelia (Ashley Johnson), granddaughter of the curator (Corey Burton). Their mission takes a spooky turn when Niblet and Squirt find themselves face to face with the awakened cat mummy Meowtuhotep. Puppy: Millie
44	"Puddles the Problem Pup"	Jos Humphrey	Story by : Rachel Lipman; Teleplay by : Tony Infante	June 23, 2013	November 13, 2013	305
The Pound Puppies help a puppy named Puddles get through a tinkling problem so his perfect person, Sam can adopt him, but Puddles problem seems uncontrollable and Sam's parents try to enlist him in a high society school. Puppy: Puddles (Grey DeLisle)
45	"It's Elementary My Dear Pup Club"	Greg Sullivan & Tim Stuby	Eric Trueheart	June 29, 2013	November 14, 2013	306
Pepper helps the Super Secret Pup Club prove that a boy named Chucky (Danny Cooksey) is innocent of vandalism at school so he can adopt a pup named Boots. Puppy: Boots (Kath Soucie)
46	"Hot Dawg!"	Jos Humphrey	Mark Drop	July 6, 2013	November 18, 2013	307
Headquarters assigns Shelter 17 a new member, a Spanish-accented Chihuahua named Antonio (Carlos Alazraqui), who has been kicked out of many shelters for getting romantically involved with the female agents. This causes the agents and Antonio to forget about placing puppies with their perfect persons and for Lucky and his team, they are his last hope if he is to remain a Pound Puppy or Antonio will be kicked out. Things get complicated when Antonio charms Cookie and Strudel that causes them to fight and forget about their latest adoptee, Pupster. Puppy: Pupster (E. G. Daily)
47	"I'm Ready for my Close Pup"	Greg Sullivan & Tim Stuby	Temple Mathews	July 13, 2013	November 19, 2013	308
Pooches, a television star pup, cannot handle the pressure of fame. She escapes and the Pound Puppies decide to help her get a break by having Cupcake disguised as Pooches, but soon the fame goes to Cupcake's head, making her snooty and egotistical. Meanwhile, the Pound Puppies discover that Pooches perfect person is her co-star, Amy (Lauren Tom), who plays Pooches' enemy on her show, but loves Pooches deeply. Puppy: Pooches (E. G. Daily)
48	"When Niblet Met Giblet"	Jos Humphrey	Phil Walsh	July 20, 2013	November 20, 2013	309
Niblet falls in love with a female sheepdog named Giblet (Ashley Johnson), who returns the feelings. When Giblet is adopted by a farmer (Jeff Bennett) Niblet goes to find her with Lucky and Cookie following him. Puppy: Giblet
49	"Once a Ralph, Always a Ralph"	Jos Humphrey	Eric Trueheart	July 27, 2013	November 21, 2013	313
When McLeish brings Ralph (Fred Stoller) over to Shelter 17, the dog begins scaring off adopters, leaving the Pound Puppies to accuse him of sabotaging their operations. Lucky attempts to prove otherwise, but when Ralph's flaws test his team's patience, the Kennel Kittens decide to make Ralph one of them. Puppy: Bobo and Chauncey (Tom Kenny)
50	"Hello Kitten"	Jos Humphrey	Story by : Eric Shaw; Teleplay by : Tony Infante	August 3, 2013	November 25, 2013	311
When a kitten named Spoons shows up to Shelter 17, the Pound Puppies tell the Super Secret Pup Club not to socialize with a kitten because cats and dogs don't always get along, and the Pound Puppies and Kennel Kittens try not to interfere with each other's business. Super Secret Pup Club, however, disobeys them and they help Spoons get to her perfect person. Suddenly, the Kennel Kittens show up and they keep placing her in the wrong home due to Ace's overconfidence. The Super Secret Pup Club and a kitten named Teensy help Spoons to get her person and try to convince Kennel Kittens that cats and dogs can live together. Ace reveals that he was friends with a puppy a long time ago and he was unable to get over his past and he almost got Spoons hurt because of his overconfidence. Spoons is with her person and the puppy friend from a long time ago. Teensy is with her person as well, but her person dresses her like a human girl. Kitten: Spoons
51	"Beauty is Only Fur Deep"	Tim Stuby	Benji Kleiman	August 10, 2013	November 26, 2013	314
A heroic rescue dog named Champ (Diedrich Bader) arrives at the shelter without any fur. Squirt makes him a full-body toupee, but the pup's lack of confidence makes it difficult to find him the perfect home. Puppy: Champ
52	"The Watchdogs"	Greg Sullivan & Tim Stuby	Evan Gore	August 17, 2013	November 27, 2013	310
Strudel begins leading a double life after being mistaken for a superhero, but her new job threatens her position on the team. Puppy: Peppy (Carlos Alazraqui)
53	"Hail to the Chief"	Greg Sullivan & Tim Stuby	Sib Ventress	August 17, 2013	November 28, 2013	312
Strudel is challenged by Agent Ping (Lauren Tom) to find the perfect people for an energetic pup named Chief (Justin Shenkarow). Puppy: Chief
54	"All Bark and Little Bite"	Jos Humphrey	Phil Walsh	August 24, 2013	December 2, 2013	315
Two of Patches' old friends tease him for hanging out with girl pups. Puppy: Bart and Tony (E. G. Daily and Cree Summer)
55	"Lucky the Dunce"	Tim Stuby	Joe Ansolabehere & Jon Rosenthal	August 31, 2013	December 3, 2013	316
Strudel's electronic scrambling device goes awry and causes Lucky to act zany. Meanwhile, Niblet must make a difficult decision about his new best friend. Puppy: Six Puppies
56	"Back in Action"	Tim Stuby	Sib Ventress	September 7, 2013	December 4, 2013	318
Bert (Clancy Brown), an old dog who is a faded TV star, has the blues until his skills are needed to aid in a rescue. Puppy: Bert and Jackpot (Lucas Grabeel)
57	"The Truth Is in Hear"	Jos Humphrey	Jos Humphrey	September 14, 2013	December 5, 2013	319
After watching too many science-fiction movies on TV, McLeish believes that the dogs are all space aliens. Puppy: Clover (E. G. Daily)
58	"No More S'mores"	Jos Humphrey	Joe Purdy	September 21, 2013	December 9, 2013	317
Shy pup Millard (Grey DeLisle) accidentally ends up on a camping trip with the High Energy Scouts and the Pound Puppies race to place him with his perfect person before the scouts overwhelm him for good. Puppy: Millard
59	"Doubles Trouble"	Tim Stuby	Chelsea Meyer	September 28, 2013	TBA	320
Sibling squabbles between Sweet Pea and Hairy threaten their adoption and their perfect owners' ping pong championship. Puppy: Sweet Pea and Hairy (Jessica DiCicco and Lucas Grabeel)
60	"Little Monster"	Jos Humphrey	Tony Infante	October 5, 2013	TBA	321
Noodles feels left out when his humans bring home a baby named J.D., and comes up with a crazy plan to get rid of him. Puppy: Noodles (Hynden Walch)
61	"Rebound's First Symphony"	Tim Stuby	Eric Trueheart	October 12, 2013	TBA	322
After a dispute between Agatha and Sumalee's mother (Margaret Cho) makes it nearly impossible for YoYo (Grey DeLisle) to be matched with Sumalee (Cree Summer), beautiful music brings peace to the neighborhood when they finally get together. Puppy: Rebound, YoYo
62	"Lord of the Fleas"	Jos Humphrey	Lisa Melbye (as Lisa Meldye)	October 19, 2013	TBA	323
During an island adventure, Solo (Carlos Alazraqui), an adventurous pup, wanders off into the jungle and it is up to the Pound Puppies to save him before a volcano erupts. Puppy: Solo
63	"The Road to Empawerment"	Jos Humphrey	Sib Ventress	October 26, 2013	TBA	325
Niblet leads three unique pups on a dangerous journey of self-discovery after listening to motivational speaker Bony Doggins (Jess Harnell). Puppy: Stuffy (Carlos Alazraqui), Schleppy (Jeff Bennett), Axel (Grey DeLisle)
64	"The Pupple's Court"	Tim Stuby	Eric Trueheart	November 9, 2013	TBA	326
Lucky's habit of following instinct over rules lands him in front of a Pound Puppy tribunal that could mean the end of Shelter 17 if he is found guilty. Puppy: Pugford (Grey DeLisle)
65	"Lucky Has to Move"	Tim Stuby	Joe Ansolabehere & Jean Ansolabehere	November 16, 2013	TBA	324
The Pound Puppies try to prevent Lucky from moving away to Florida by jinxing a promotion for Dot's dad. Puppy: Beardy (Alanna Ubach)
