= We Need Girlfriends =

Comedy web series

We Need Girlfriends is an 11-episode comedy web series.

== Background ==
The series was created by Steven Tsapelas, Angel Acevedo and Brian Amyot. It was produced by their Astoria, New York based film production company Ragtag Productions.

The series chronicles the lives of Tom, Rod and Henry. After college, the three friends move into an apartment together and are all simultaneously dumped by their girlfriends.

The series was then picked up for possible development for a television version of We Need Girlfriends for Sony Pictures and CBS, to be executive produced by Darren Star, Dennis Erdman and Clark Peterson. The project was eventually canceled.

== Episode list ==
The web series premiered on November 1, 2006 and the season finale aired on YouTube on September 16, 2007.

No.	Title
1	"Pilot"
Tom, Henry, and Rod find themselves newly single for the first time in four years. Tom and Rod battle over their squirrel Lucy.
2	"Blue Party"
Tom, Henry and Rod are invited to a blue party.
3	"MySpace"
Rod and Henry try to make Tom's ex-girlfriend jealous by pimping out his MySpace page.
4	"Rod Vs Henry"
Rod photoshops a picture of himself with Henry's ex-girlfriend, which leads to a childish battle between the two friends. This was the first episode that contained the popular "Team Rod" and "Team Henry" T-shirts.
5	"First Date Ever"
Tom goes on his first date with Lucy, which is actually the first "real" date he's ever been on. Meanwhile, Henry watches a Three's Company marathon and loses his grip on reality.
6	"Game Night"
Rod finds out Tom is dating Lucy and insists they have a game night to battle for who gets to date her.
7	"The Boyfriend"
Lucy reveals she's still living with her ex-boyfriend, Dennis. Dennis enlists Rod's help in spying on Tom and Lucy.
8	"Future Henry"
Henry receives a letter he wrote to himself in 8th grade, which leads him to his old middle school crush, Jenny. The episode develops Henry's obsession with science fiction.
9	"The Morning After"
Rod is jealous of Henry and Jenny, so he drags Tom to a party to meet women.
10	"Future Rod"
Due to a "mistake", Rod is forced to grow up and he instead runs away. Tom and Henry try to get him to do the right thing.
11	"Goodbye Forever"
A lonely Tom reconciles with Sarah, but after Rod and Henry teach him an important lesson from Terminator 2: Judgment Day, he has a big decision to make.

== Cast ==
- Tom - Patrick Cohen
- Henry - Seth Kirschner
- Rod - Evan Bass
- Lucy - Brigitte Hagerman
- Jenny - Summer Hagen
- Lauren - Johanna Igel
- Dennis - Steven LaChioma
