= Pound Puppies (2010 TV series) =

American-Canadian children's animated television series

- Genre: Comedy; Adventure; Children's animation Fantasy
- Based on: Pound Puppies by Michael Bowling
- Developed by: Wendy Moss Klein; Nancy Steingard; Paul Germain; Joe Ansolabehere
- Voices of: Eric McCormack; René Auberjonois; Yvette Nicole Brown; John DiMaggio; Michael Rapaport; Alanna Ubach; M. Emmet Walsh; Brooke Goldner; Cree Summer; Jessica DiCicco; Betty White
- Theme music composer: Jonathan Evans
- Opening theme: "Pound Puppies"
- Ending theme: "Pound Puppies"
- Composers: Daniel Ingram; Steffan Andrews
- Countries of origin: Canada; United States
- Original language: English
- No. of seasons: 3
- No. of episodes: 65 (list of episodes)

Production
- Executive producers: Wendy Moss Klein (seasons 1–2); Nancy Steingard (seasons 1–2); Paul Germain (season 1); Joe Ansolabehere (season 1); Vince Commisso (episodes 1–7); Steve Jarosz (episodes 1–7); Chris Bartleman (episodes 8–65); Blair Peters (episodes 8–26); Kirsten Newlands (episodes 8–65); Bart Jennett (season 3); Stephen Davis
- Producers: Paul Germain (episodes 1–8); Joe Ansolabehere (episodes 1–8); Marissa Collyer (episodes 1–8); Elana Adair (episodes 8–65); Alfred Gimeno (episodes 12–39); Kimberly Small (season 3)
- Running time: 22 minutes
- Production companies: Paul & Joe Productions (season 1); 9 Story Entertainment (episodes 1–7); DHX Media Vancouver (episodes 8–65); Hasbro Studios

Original release
- Network: The Hub/Hub Network
- Release: October 10, 2010 – November 16, 2013

Pound Puppies is an animated television series developed by Wendy Klein Moss, Nancy Steingard, Paul Germain and Joe Ansolabehere for the Hub Network. It debuted on October 10, 2010 in the United States as the first Hub "original series". It also aired on YTV in Canada and on Boomerang in the United Kingdom, Ireland, Scandinavia and Australia. Produced by Hasbro Studios, it was the second series (after the 1986 series) to adapt Pound Puppies into a cartoon format. Originally a property by Tonka, Hasbro acquired Tonka itself and currently manages Pound Puppies. The plot style and music were similar to the 1960s TV series Hogan's Heroes and to films like Stalag 17 and The Great Escape. The first seven episodes of the series were animated by 9 Story Entertainment, but DHX Media Vancouver took over to animate the series from episode 8 onwards.

The show is known for being one of four original series from The Hub to win the CINE Golden Eagle Award for high quality production and storytelling in July 2012; one month later, the Season 1 episode "I Never Barked for My Father" was honored with the Humanitas Prize for excellence in writing for children's television animation. 65 episodes were produced.

The show currently airs reruns on Discovery Family.

== Plot ==
The Pound Puppies (Lucky the Hero, Cookie the Action Girl, Niblet the Plucky Comic Relief, Strudel the Gadgeteer Genius, and Squirt the Sneaky Guy) are a group of dogs who spend most of their time at Shelter 17. Together with a group of squirrels recruited by Strudel, an incredibly smart Dachshund, they operate a secret and highly sophisticated underground facility beneath the pound, aimed at finding new owners for puppies or even grown up dogs that come to their pound. They rely on their motto, "A pup for every person, and a person for every pup". Although the facility is filled with advanced equipment (mainly built by Strudel and the squirrels) and is often shown bustling with activity, it consistently manages to avoid detection by the pound's clueless human staff. Several episodes have shown that there are multiple Pound Puppies units worldwide. There is also a similar organization, the "Kennel Kittens", which is a group of cats at the Happy Valley shelter that try to find forever homes for the kittens and cats that come their way. The Kennel Kittens have appeared in several episodes, and often mess up the Pound Puppies' missions. The Pound Puppies also have an unofficial side branch, the "Super Secret Pup Club".

A recurring plot often involves the Pound Puppies helping dogs find loving homes and coming across various challenges as they do so. Once a dog is successfully matched with a new owner, the Pound Puppies give them a dog tag shaped like a dog house as a parting gift, along with the quote, "Once a pound puppy, always a pound puppy".

== Episodes ==
Season	Episodes	Originally released	
Season	Episodes	First released	Last released
1	26	October 10, 2010	January 28, 2012
2	13	June 2, 2012	December 1, 2012
3	26	June 1, 2013	November 16, 2013

== Characters ==
=== Pound Puppies ===
The following dogs appear regularly in the series.

- Lucky (voiced by Eric McCormack) is the Mongrel dog of the group and the leader of the underground facility. Well-adjusted and intelligent, but strict, he exudes authority and is often obeyed without question. He has a secret crush on Cookie (as revealed in "Rebel Without a Collar" and "When Niblet Met Giblet"), but he prefers to hide his feelings. In "When Niblet Met Giblet", however, he tried to show Cookie his feelings, even going as far as holding her paw. He never gets to confess because Lucky is always interrupted. As shown in an official plush toy, his last name is "Smarts". He appears to be a German Shepherd–Scottish Terrier–Golden Retriever–Jack Russell Terrier mix. He was described by McLeish, owner and manager of the pound as "the scruffy, sneaky one who always seems to be here". Although he was adopted by a rather excitable young girl named Dot Henderson in "Lucky Gets Adopted", he prefers to be at the pound, managing adoptions and planning missions. While it is revealed that Lucky actually has six brothers and three sisters, he thought he had five, but after meeting up with his father again (as in "I Never Barked For My Father"), he found out he had one more younger brother. His catchphrase is "Go, dogs, go" which he says to get the dogs to go into action.
- Cookie (voiced by Yvette Nicole Brown) is a tough-talking, but kind and smart Boxer who is Lucky's second-in-command. She has a secret crush on Lucky the same way he does (as revealed in "The General" and "When Niblet Met Giblet"), but not when she gets her stomach touched. Every time Lucky wants to confess that he loves her they get interrupted. In "Mutternal Instincts", she grows close to a puppy she affectionately names Cupcake and, at the end, her family adopts her. As shown in an official plush toy, her full name is "Sugar Cookie".
- Niblet (voiced by John DiMaggio) is a huge and sometimes clumsy and slow-witted Old English Sheepdog with a big heart. He has a little sister named Rebound. In "When Niblet Met Giblet", he fell in love with a fellow Old English Sheepdog, Giblet, but when she found her perfect person, he decided to stay with the Pound Puppies team. Although Niblet is not the smartest of the group, he means well. Niblet also has been shown to love peanut butter. Niblet also is the only dog of the main five not to wear a collar with a keychain on it. He is also the only dog of the main five who does not have any form of owner.
- Strudel (voiced by Alanna Ubach) is a genius German Dachshund who creates many of the inventions used by the Pound Puppies. She is usually assisted by squirrels (due to her lack of opposable thumbs) and is the most intelligent dog in the group. For a small dog, she has a big ego and is extremely cocky, but she does love her friends, and can be kind and brave. She brags how smart she is and tends to show off her intelligence. She often works in the background, which often makes her jealous of the other main five dogs. In "My Fair Rebound", it is revealed that she used to be a show dog and her stage name was Strudel diSchnitzel Von Wiener. In Season 3, it is revealed that Strudel used to have an owner, who was a scientist.
- Squirt (voiced by Michael Rapaport) is a yellow Chihuahua, and is the smallest and most street-smart of the group and Niblet's closest companion in the series. Although Squirt speaks with a New York accent, the episode "I Never Barked For My Father" revealed that he was born in Hoboken, New Jersey. Squirt can be negative, but he will always be there for his team. Since he is the smallest member of the team, he sometimes ends up in wacky costumes in order to complete missions, including a cat, possum, rabbit, and flower. Squirt also had a friend named Peewee which he thought was eaten by an alligator. He gets adopted by accident in Season 2.
- Rebound (voiced by Brooke Goldner) is Niblet's little sister, who was first seen in the namesake episode. True to her namesake, she was adopted and returned to the pound many times due to her overenthusiastic nature. She finally finds her forever home with Agatha McLeish. She is a member of the Super Secret Pup Club. Starting with season 2, she – along with Cupcake and Patches – is added to the opening sequence.
- Cupcake (voiced by Cree Summer) is a puppy who is Cookie's adopted daughter. She is a member of the Super Secret Pup Club. She appears to be a Boxer/Labrador mix. She is smart and quick-thinking, although sometimes her puppy energy gets her into sticky situations. Introduced in the Season 1 episode, "Mutternal Instincts", she started off as a cute and innocent character, but after she joined the Super Secret Pup Club, she had a more down-to-earth personality. Starting with season 2, she – along with Rebound and Patches – is added to the opening sequence.
- Patches (voiced by Jessica DiCicco) is a Dalmatian puppy first introduced in a season 2 episode known as the "Super Secret Pup Club". He idolizes the Pound Puppies, in particular Lucky, and is the leader and creator of the Super Secret Pup Club (an unofficial branch of the Pound Puppies organization). According to an official plush toy, his last name is "McFrisky". Before he was first introduced, he appeared in and – along with Rebound and Cupcake – was added to the opening sequence.

=== Humans ===
- Leonard McLeish (voiced by René Auberjonois) is the temperamental manager of Shelter 17. His last name (McLeish) is a play on the word "leash". He does not like his career and wishes for a better one. As such, he is unaware of the Pound Puppies' operations. Starting with "I Heard The Barks On Christmas Eve", he is shown to secretly like dogs and, in the same episode, he adopts his own perfect dog, a chocolate-colored Labrador Retriever named Ralph. The Mayor is his brother-in-law. He supposedly has a sister. His mother is Agatha McLeish.
- Olaf Hugglesbjork (voiced by M. Emmet Walsh) is the eccentric, kind caretaker of Shelter 17 and McLeish's aide. He is in charge of new dog arrivals, and assists pound visitors in finding a matching pet they have to adopt. Like McLeish, he is unaware of the Pound Puppies' operations. He has started dating Gertrude Washburn the librarian as of the episode "Olaf in Love".
- Agatha McLeish (voiced by Betty White) is the mother of Leonard McLeish who initially hated dogs until she met Rebound, whom she adopted. She is somewhat strict with her son but dotes on Rebound.
- Milton Feltwaddle (voiced by Jim Parsons) is an uptight businessman determined to change Shelter 17 for what he believes is the better. He appeared in "Toyoshiko: Bark Friend Machine" and "McLeish Unleashed".
- Mayor Jerry (voiced by Dabney Coleman in Season 1, and by John Larroquette in Season 2) is the brother-in-law of Leonard McLeish. He acts kind and pleasant in public and in front of children, but underneath, he has a very self-centered personality. He is constantly pushing McLeish to do things for him, and berates him for making mistakes. He cares little for potential voters, desiring only their votes, and likes to mock them behind their backs.
- Ketchum is the "silent" animal control officer who frequently brings the puppies to Shelter 17, thus instigating the episodes' events. For the most part, he appears emotionless, but in the series finale, he expressed excitement when McLeish fired him.
- Dot Henderson (voiced by Grey DeLisle) is a young, energetic and lonesome girl who adopts Lucky. She first appeared in the final episode of Season 1, "Lucky Gets Adopted" and later reappears in the Season 3 episodes "No More S'Mores", "The Pupple's Court" and "Lucky Has to Move". She is the only human who knows that the dogs can talk.
- Claudio (voiced by Jeff Bennett) is an Italian fisherman who appears in several episodes.
- Mr. Julius (voiced by George Takei) is a famous dog trainer who appeared in "My Fair Rebound", "The Ruff Ruff Bunch" and "Hail to the Chief".

=== Recurring characters ===
- Dolly (voiced by E. G. Daily) is a pink and white poodle as the General who is a near-legendary member to the Pound Puppies network.
- Ralph (voiced by Fred Stoller) is a chocolate-colored Labrador Retriever adult dog who is lazy and rarely pays attention to his surroundings. His first appearance is in "I Heard the Barks on Christmas Eve" and also made appearances in "The Truth Is In Hear" and "Once A Ralph, Always A Ralph". He shows an interest in chewing shoes. He is owned by Leonard McLeish, as Leonard is shown in "I Heard Barks on Christmas Eve" where he is left under Leonard's Christmas tree as a present from the Pound Puppies.
- Pepper (voiced by Jennifer Carpenter) is a young puppy who became a police dog in "The K9 Kid" and reappeared in "I Heard The Barks On Christmas Eve" and "It's Elementary My Dear Pup Club". She is serious about becoming a police dog and is strict. Her perfect person is a boy named Charlie, who also wants to become a policeman. Even after Sarge, Charlie's father's dog, turned down Pepper, Pepper didn't let that stop her, but just like Cookie and Cupcake, Lucky can show affection for Pepper.
- Agent Ping (voiced by Lauren Tom) is a persnickety Shiba Inu who is part of the Pound Puppies Chinese operation. She appeared in the first season episodes "Homeward Pound" and "Mutternal Instincts" and the third season episodes "Hail To The Chief" and "The Pupple's Court".
- Dash Whippet (voiced by Corey Burton) is a brown, elder Whippet and a legendary member of Pound Puppies. He appeared in the second season episode "Barlow" and the third season episode "The Pupple's Court".

==== Kennel Kittens ====
The Kennel Kittens are a group of cats who help find homes for kittens. Their goals sometimes bring them into conflict with the Pound Puppies. They first appeared in "Catcalls" and last appeared in "Hello Kitten". They are as follows:

- Ace (voiced by Eric McCormack) is the leader of Shelter 71, known as Happy Valley. He is a Bicolor cat and a cat version of Lucky, the leader of Shelter 17. He is much more ruthless and less honorable than Lucky, willing to use deception and cheap tricks to get what he wants. It is revealed in Season 3 that his hatred of dogs stems from having been abandoned as a kitten by his dog friend for his perfect person.
- Fluffy (voiced by Yvette Nicole Brown) is a Ragamuffin cat and cat version of Cookie. She, just like Cookie, is second in command of Shelter 71. She is believed to have a crush on Squirt instead of on Ace. Instead of pink, the bow on her head is yellow. It appears to be a bit easier for her soft side to come out compared to Cookie.
- Tiny (voiced by John DiMaggio) is a Maine Coon cat and cat version of Niblet. He, unlike Niblet, actually does wear a teal collar. He is the only one who is pretty much one-to-one with his dog counterpart, being just as dimwitted and good-natured.
- Squeak (voiced by Michael Rapaport) is a Siamese cat and cat version of Squirt. He is shown to be less empathetic than Squirt, sending Squirt himself (disguised as a cat) on a dangerous mission to claim fish heads that are being guarded by a big, dangerous dog named Chubba, to whom they had already lost three cats in the span of a single month.
- Kugel (voiced by Alanna Ubach) is a Munchkin cat and cat version of Strudel. She does not appear to be as egotistical as Strudel, as she is never shown boasting about her own abilities. She does, however, state that cats are scientifically smarter than dogs.

=== Other ===
- Shakes is a coyote.
- Fang (voiced by Luke Perry) is a coyote in "The Rebel Without a Collar".
- Scar (voiced by Clifton Collins Jr.) – a coyote.
- Weasel (voiced by Clifton Collins Jr.) – a coyote.
- Shagface (voiced by Corey Burton) – a wolf.
- Lola (voiced by Alanna Ubach) – a wolf in "When Niblet Met Giblet".
- Stain (voiced by Clancy Brown) – a dog.
- Rover (voiced by Sam McMurray) – an alligator in "Rebel Without a Collar".
- Mittens (voiced by E. G. Daily) – a kitten.
- Lily (voiced by Tara Strong) – a kitten.
- Spoons (voiced by Alanna Ubach) – a calico kitten in "Hello Kitten".
- Teensy (voiced by Jessica DiCicco) – a kitten.
- Madame Pickypuss (voiced by Tress MacNeille) – a Persian cat in "The Prince and the Pupper" and "The Ruff Ruff Bunch".
- Bumper – a puppy.
- McGuffin is an Irish Setter puppy in "The Prince and the Pupper".
- Pooches McFurFace (voiced by E. G. Daily) – a puppy in "I'm Ready for my Close Pup".
- Millie (voiced by Jeannie Elias) – a puppy.
- Bony Boggins (voiced by Jess Harnell) – a dog speaker.
- Bert (voiced by Clancy Brown) – an old German Shepherd of TV action show in "Back in Action".
- Miss Stiffwhiskers (voiced by Tress MacNeille) – a bulldog in "The Pupple's Court".
- Agent François (voiced by Maurice LaMarche) – a French Bulldog in "Mutternal Instincts" and "Hail to the Chief".
- Freddie (voiced by Justin Shenkarow) – an ugly-looking Xolo-mix puppy in "Nightmare on Pound Street" and "I Heard the Barks on Christmas Eve".
- Chief (voiced by Justin Shenkarow) – a puppy in "Hail to the Chief".
- Bumper – a puppy.
- Cuddlesworth (voiced by Ted Biaselli) is a pampered, well-mannered chihuahua with a British accent who looks identical to Squirt in "The Prince and the Pupper" and "The Ruff Ruff Bunch".
- Agent Todd (voiced by Dave Thomas) is an Alaskan Malamute agent in "Homeward Pound" and "Mutternal Instincts".
- Agent Rick (voiced by Dave Foley) is a dog agent in "Homeward Pound".
- Bingo (voiced by Charles Shaughnessy) – a Doberman Pinscher.
- Bondo (voiced by Jeff Bennett) – a basenji in "The Pups Who Loved Me".
- Tundra (voiced by Hunter Parrish) – a Siberian Husky puppy.
- Sven (voiced by Kevin Michael Richardson) – a Siberian Husky.
- Gwen (voiced by Pamela Adlon) – a Siberian Husky in "Snow Problem".
- Buck – a mutt.
- Slick (voiced by Gary Cole) – a mutt and Lucky's father in "I Never Barked for My Father".
- Sid (voiced by Kevin Michael Richardson) – a corgi.
- Salty (voiced by Clancy Brown) – an eyepatch-wearing dog in "Salty".
- Humphrey (voiced by Danny Cooksey) – a Yorkshire Terrier puppy.
- Babette (voiced by Kath Soucie) – a poodle in "Dog on a Wire".
- Twiggy (voiced by E. G. Daily) – an Afghan Hound in "Taboo".
- Rocky (voiced by Clancy Brown) – a pit bull.
- Billy Ray (voiced by Clancy Brown) – a bloodhound.
- Bumbles (voiced by Kevin Michael Richardson) – a Bernese Mountain Dog.
- Tyson (voiced by Clancy Brown) – a Rottweiler.
- Buddy (voiced by Richard Lewis) – an American Eskimo Dog.
- Champ (voiced by Diedrich Bader) – a St. Bernard rescue dog.
- Chubba (voiced by Clancy Brown) – a bulldog.
- Brutus (voiced by John York) – an Australian Cattle Dog.
- Sterling Von Oxnard (voiced by Clancy Brown) – an Airedale Terrier in "My Fair Rebound".
- Sarge (voiced by James Remar) – a police German Shepherd.
- Miss Petunia (voiced by Glenne Headly) – a Golden Retriever in "Pound Preemies".
- Cinnamon (voiced by Cree Summer) – a Golden Retriever puppy and one of Miss Petunia's litter.
- Missy, Molly and Muff-Muff (voiced by Anndi McAfee, Kath Soucie and Rachel Crane) – three Cocker Spaniels in "Lucky Gets Adopted".
- Fifi (voiced by John DiMaggio) – a Maltese dog.
- Foofoo (voiced by Ted Biaselli) – a Havanese dog.
- Chuckles (voiced by Tom Kenny) – a circus dog in "Dog on a Wire".
- Chauncey (voiced by Tom Kenny) – a Welsh Corgi.
- BoBo (voiced by Tom Kenny) – a French Bulldog puppy in "Once a Ralph, Always a Ralph".
- Zoltron (voiced by French Stewart) – an alien pug in "Zoltron".
- Marshmallow (voiced by Alanna Ubach) – a bulldog puppy.
- Millard (voiced by Grey DeLisle) – a Basset Hound puppy in "No More S'mores".
- Bart and Tony (voiced by E. G. Daily and Cree Summer) – two puppies in "All Bark and Little Bite".
- Ginger (voiced by Kath Soucie) – a Cocker Spaniel puppy.
- Clover (voiced by E. G. Daily) – a puppy.
- Solo (voiced by Carlos Alazraqui) – a puppy in "Lord of the Fleas".
- Camelia (voiced by E. G. Daily) – a puppy.
- Stuffy, Schleppy and Axel (Carlos Alazraqui, Jeff Bennett and Grey DeLisle) – three puppies, a pug, a basset hound/dachshund mix and a gray puppy in a wheelchair in "The Road to Empawerment".
- Boots (voiced by Kath Soucie) – a puppy.
- Yo Yo (voiced by Grey DeLisle) – a Cavalier King Charles Spaniel puppy in "Rebound's First Symphony".
- Zipper (voiced by Tara Strong) – a Border Collie puppy in "Zipper the Zoomit Dog".
- Spotty, Nougat and Gizmo (voiced by Cree Summer, E. G. Daily and Pamela Adlon) – Cocker Spaniel puppies in "The Call of the Squirreldog".
- Dimples (voiced by E. G. Daily) – a poodle cross puppy.
- Yakov (voiced by Rob Paulsen) – a Russian puppy in "The Pups Who Loved Me".
- Piper (voiced by Anndi McAfee) – a puppy in "Good Dog, McLeish!".
- Boots (voiced by Kath Soucie) – a puppy.
- Jackpot (voiced by Lucas Grabeel) – a Scottish Terrier in "Back in Action".
- Pupster (voiced by E. G. Daily) – a Chihuahua puppy
- Puddles (voiced by Grey DeLisle) – a white scruffy puppy in "Puddles the Problem Pup".
- Millie (voiced by Jeannie Elias) – a puppy.
- Greasy (voiced by Kath Soucie) – a dirty puppy.
- Noodles (voiced by Hynden Walch) – a Labrador dog mix in "Little Monster".
- Sweet Pea (voiced by Jessica DiCicco) – a Cocker Spaniel puppy in "Doubles Trouble".
- Hairy (voiced by Lucas Grabeel) – a hairy puppy in "Doubles Trouble".
- Chip (voiced by Danny Cooksey) – a puppy.
- Poopsie – a Labrador Retriever puppy.
- Buttercup (voiced by Grey DeLisle) – a puppy in "Cuddle Up Buttercup".
- Roxie (voiced by Alanna Ubach) – a Dalmatian puppy in "The Accidental Pup Star".
- Suds (voiced by Rob Paulsen) – a Jack Russell Terrier.
- Beardy (voiced by Alanna Ubach) – an Affenpinscher puppy.
- Princess (voiced by Dom Irrera) is a Maltese in "The Fraud Princess".
- Zippster, Kippster and Tip-Tip (voiced by Cree Summer, Jessica DiCicco and E. G. Daily) – three puppies in "Barlow".
- The Quintuplets (Whip and Tip voiced by E. G. Daily, Flip and Blip voiced by Kath Soucie, Chubbers voiced by Alanna Ubach) – five puppies in "Quintuplets".
- Sweetie (voiced by Jessica DiCicco) – a puppy in "The Watchdogs".
- Checkers (voiced by Kath Soucie) – a puppy.
- Dinky (voiced by Lauren Tom) – a puppy.
- Kiki (voiced by Jentle Phoenix) – a puppy in "Olaf in Love".
- Shaggles (voiced by Grey DeLisle) – a puppy.
- Nutmeg (voiced by Tara Strong) – a puppy.
- Wagster (voiced by Tara Strong) – a puppy.
- Yipper (voiced by Danny Cooksey) – a puppy. in "The Yipper Caper".
- Farfel (voiced by Alanna Ubach) – a puppy.
- Vanilli (voiced by E. G. Daily) – a puppy.
- Puddles (voiced by Grey DeLisle) – a puppy, and not to be confused with the white scruffy puppy.
- Taboo (voiced by Pamela Adlon) – a puppy in "Taboo".
- Pugford (voiced by Grey DeLisle) – a black pug in "The Pupple's Court".
- Chocko, Scout and Winnie (voiced by Pamela Adlon, E. G. Daily and Cree Summer) are Rottweiler puppies in "The Call of the Squirreldog".
- Corky (voiced by Georgina Cordova) – a puppy.
- Doggy Lama (voiced by John DiMaggio) – a dog.
- Barlow (voiced by John DiMaggio) – a Basset Hound in "Barlow".
- Antonio (voiced by Carlos Alazraqui) – a Chihuahua in "Hot Dawg!".
- Peppy (voiced by Carlos Alazraqui) – a puppy.
- Chris Jingles (voiced by John DiMaggio) is an Old English Sheepdog and a dog version of Santa Claus in "I Heard the Barks on Christmas Eve".
- Agent Gus (voiced by Jeff Bennett) – a pug in "I Heard the Barks on Christmas Eve".
- Giblet (voiced by Ashley Johnson) is an Old English Sheepdog who has a crush on Niblet in "When Niblet Met Giblet".

== Home media ==
The entire series was also released on DVD. Home media for Pound Puppies was distributed by Shout! Factory.

Title	Release date	Episodes	Additional features
Homeward Pound	March 6, 2012	"Homeward Pound" (Season 1, Episode 11); "My Fair Rebound" (Season 1, Episode 8); "Quintuplets" (Season 1, Episode 9); "The K9 Kid" (Season 1, Episode 19); "Zoltron" (Season 1, Episode 15)	Bonus feature - "Learn to Draw Lucky!"
Super Secret Pup Club	October 16, 2012	"Bone Voyage" (Season 1, Episode 17); "Mutternal Instincts" (Season 1, Episode 25); "The Fraud Princess" (Season 2, Episode 2); "The Super Secret Pup Club" (Season 2, Episode 3); "The Ruff Ruff Bunch" (Season 2, Episode 7)	
Mission: Adoption	May 21, 2013	"King of the Heap" (Season 1, Episode 7); "Taboo" (Season 1, Episode 13); "Snow Problem" (Season 1, Episode 18); "Zipper the Zoomit Dog" (Season 2, Episode 1); "There's Something About Camelia" (Season 2, Episode 5)	Bonus feature - Printable adoption certificate
Holiday Hijinks	November 5, 2013	"I Heard the Barks on Christmas Eve" (Season 2, Episode 13); "I Never Barked for My Father" (Season 1, Episode 21); "Barlow" (Season 2, Episode 4); "Good Dog, McLeish!" (Season 2, Episode 6); "The Prince and the Pupper" (Season 1, Episode 5)	
A Perfect Match	April 8, 2014	"The Yipper Caper" (Season 1, Episode 1); "Hello Kitten" (Season 3, Episode 11); "No More S'mores" (Season 3, Episode 19); "Beauty Is Only Fur Deep" (Season 3, Episode 12); "Working K9 To 5" (Season 3, Episode 1)	
Puppy Love	February 3, 2015	"Toyoshiko! Bark Friend Machine" (Season 1, Episode 14); "McLeish Unleashed" (Season 1, Episode 22); "The General" (Season 1, Episode 4); "When Niblet Met Giblet" (Season 3, Episode 9); "Rebound's First Symphony" (Season 3, Episode 22)	Bonus feature - Printable valentine
Pick of the Litter	July 14, 2015	"Dog on a Wire" (Season 1, Episode 10); "Pound Preemies" (Season 2, Episode 13); "Cuddle Up Buttercup" (Season 3, Episode 2); "The Pups Who Loved Me" (Season 3, Episode 3); "I'm Ready for My Close Pup" (Season 3, Episode 8)	
Rare Pair	January 19, 2016	"Catcalls" (Season 1, Episode 6); "The Really Weird Dog" (Season 1, Episode 16); "The Call of the Squirreldog" (Season 1, Episode 20); "Kennel Kittens Return" (Season 1, Episode 24); "Once a Ralph, Always a Ralph" (Season 3, Episode 10)	
Showstopping Pups	April 16, 2016	"The Accidental Pup Star" (Season 2, Episode 10); "It's Elementary, My Dear Pup Club" (Season 3, Episode 6); "Hot Dawg!" (Season 3, Episode 7); "The Watchdogs" (Season 3, Episode 13); "Back in Action" (Season 3, Episode 17)	
Halloween at Shelter 17	August 30, 2016	"Nightmare on Pound Street" (Season 1, Episode 2); "Rebel Without a Collar" (Season 1, Episode 12); "Fright at the Museum" (Season 3, Episode 4); "The Truth is in Hear" (Season 3, Episode 18); "Little Monster" (Season 3, Episode 21); "Lord of the Fleas" (Season 3, Episode 23)	
Puppy Party	December 13, 2016	"Rebound" (Season 1, Episode 3); "Olaf in Love" (Season 1, Episode 23); "Puddles the Problem Pup" (Season 3, Episode 5); "Hail to the Chief" (Season 3, Episode 14); "All Bark and Little Bite" (Season 3, Episode 15); "Doubles Trouble" (Season 3, Episode 20); "The Road to Empawerment" (Season 3, Episode 24)	
Lucky Time	April 18, 2017	"Lucky Gets Adopted" (Season 1, Episode 26); "Salty" (Season 2, Episode 8); "Squawk" (Season 2, Episode 9); "No Dogs Allowed" (Season 2, Episode 11); "Lucky the Dunce" (Season 3, Episode 16); "The Pupple's Court" (Season 3, Episode 25); "Lucky Has to Move" (Season 3, Episode 26)	

== Toys ==
In Summer 2012, Hasbro released a line of toys for The Hub's Pound Puppies series, consisting mainly of plush toys (including Lucky, Cookie, Rebound, Patches, Cupcake and a minor character, Nutmeg) and small figures. Each plush toy came with an "Adoption Certificate" tag that one could fill out. One could also access an official website and download a Pound Puppies adoption certificate.
