= David Newell =

American actor (born 1938)

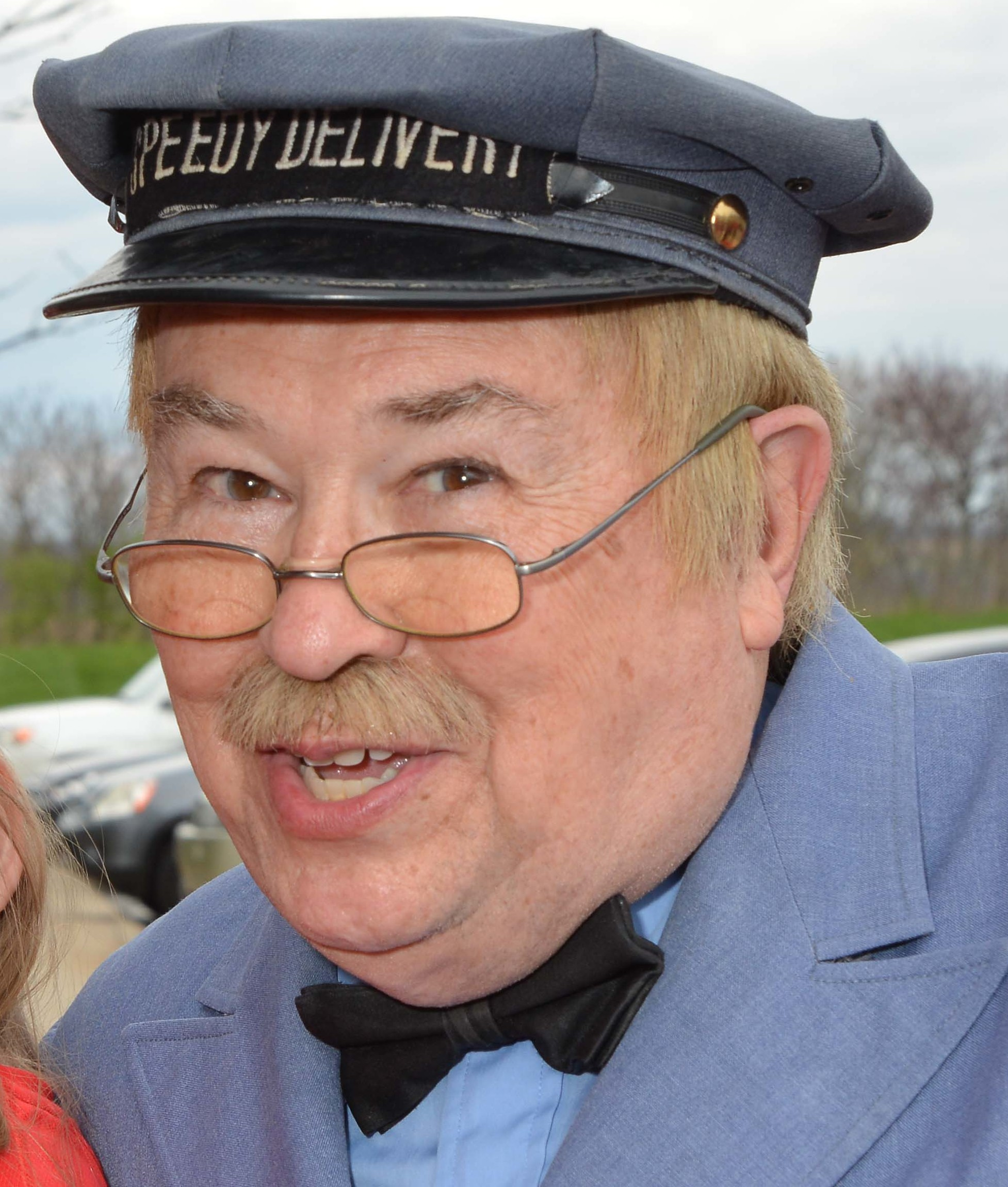
- Newell as Mr. McFeely in 2015
- Born: David Alexander Newell; November 24, 1938 (age 87); O'Hara Township, Pennsylvania, United States
- Occupation: Actor
- Years active: 1968–2015
- Known for: Mr. McFeely on Mister Rogers’ Neighborhood
- Children: 3

David Alexander Newell (born November 24, 1938) is an American television actor known primarily for his portrayal of Mr. McFeely, the delivery man on Mister Rogers' Neighborhood. He also worked in the public relations department of Fred Rogers Productions. His character's most famous catchphrase was "Speedy Delivery!" He toured the country until he retired in 2015, promoting Mister Rogers' Neighborhood as Mr. McFeely.

== Life ==
Newell was born in O'Hara Township, Pennsylvania, a suburb of Pittsburgh. A graduate of the University of Pittsburgh, he was the director of public relations for Fred Rogers Productions. Newell still resides in O'Hara Township with his wife Nan. They have a daughter, Catherine; two sons, Taylor and Alexander; and four grandchildren.

== Career ==
Newell began his acting career at a theatre school known as the Pittsburgh Playhouse. Through connections made there, he eventually met Fred Rogers. Newell was originally hired onto the show as a public relations manager, but Rogers also cast him in the role of Mr. McFeely. (McFeely was Rogers' middle name, taken from his mother's maiden name.) As a result, he and Rogers became lifelong friends until Rogers' death in 2003.

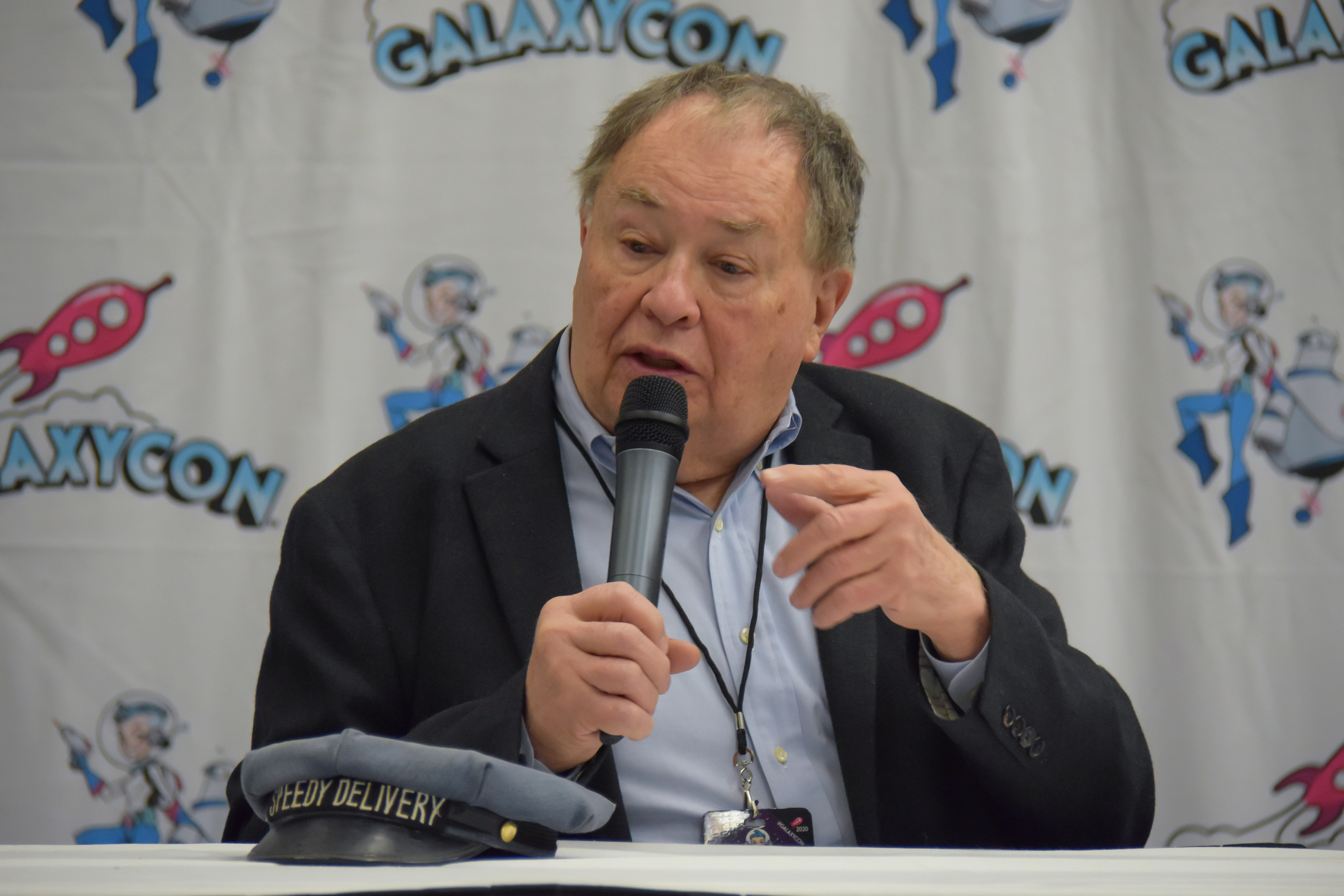
David Newell Q&A at Galaxy Con Richmond 2020

A documentary feature about Newell entitled Speedy Delivery, which chronicles his travels around the world as Mr. McFeely, debuted on public television in 2008.

An animated version of Mr. McFeely is a recurring character on the new PBS series Daniel Tiger's Neighborhood. Canadian actor Derek McGrath performs the voice.

In 2017, Newell appeared as a special guest on the live-action children's web series Danny Joe's Tree House.

Newell made a cameo in the Fred Rogers biopic A Beautiful Day in the Neighborhood.

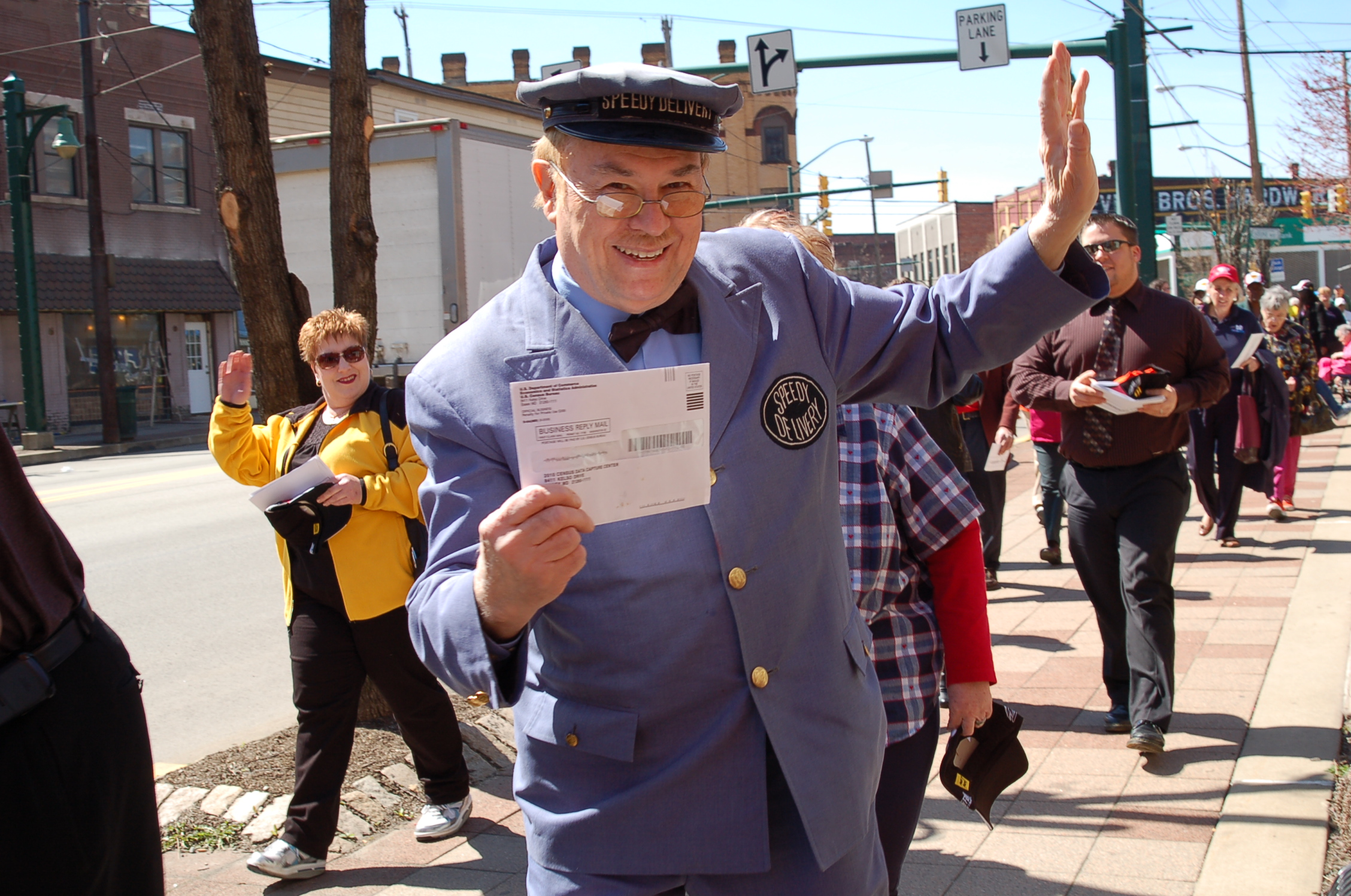
Newell dressed as Mr. McFeely ("Speedy Delivery") leading a group to the post office to hand-deliver their completed 2010 Census forms during the "Count Me In In 2010 Rally" in Homestead, Pennsylvania.

== Quotes ==
"Working with Fred Rogers was like receiving a master’s degree in child development. Fred taught by example, and he was subtle—but suddenly you’d realize that, after working side by side with him, your knowledge base had expanded almost beyond description."

"What I like about Danny Joe's Tree House is that children can interact with a live person. Danny is a big kid at heart and I think that is very helpful. In today's world where everything is virtual and robotic, here's a person giving original thoughts and ideas."
