= Kristen Flores =

American actress

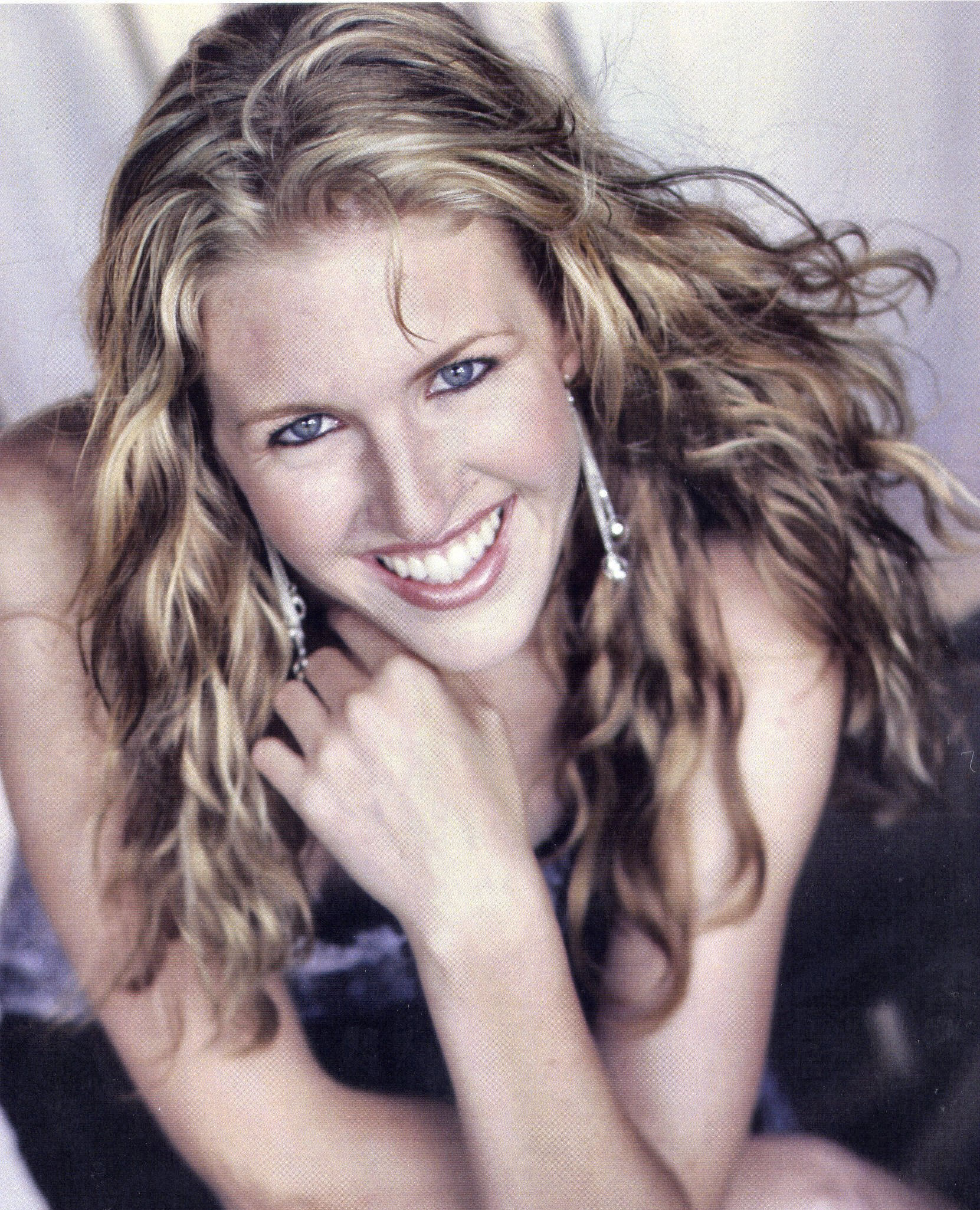
- Kristen Flores
- Born: Kristen Lee Ridgway; Seattle, Washington, U.S.
- Education: Westmont College
- Occupations: actress, set designer, production designer, and film producer
- Known for: Founder and CEO of The Feel Good Film Festival
- Spouse: Dominic (Stephen) Flores (m. 2009)
- Children: 3 sons, 1 daughter

Kristen Ridgway Flores is Founder and CEO of The Feel Good Film Festival in Hollywood, California and an American actress, set designer, production designer, and film producer.

== Early life ==
Ms. Flores received her early theatre and acting training in Seattle, Washington, where she participated in numerous theatrical productions including "Helen Keller", "Guys and Dolls", "South Pacific", "Narnia", and "Little Mary Sunshine".

She continued her theatrical and acting studies in Santa Barbara, California at the "Westmont College Theatre Arts Department" where she received her theatre and communications degrees. After relocating to Hollywood, she pursued a curriculum of film studies.

== Film and television ==
Flores contributions include actress, production designer, set designer, and producer for Hollywood films and television programs, including the television comedy series, "The Playbook". Flores' first credited film in 2005 was "West Bank Story", the Academy Awards winning, fast-paced musical comedy. In 2006-2007 Flores worked in the art department of the television series, Heroes, which received the 2007 Academy of Television Arts & Sciences nomination for the Art Director's Guild Award. From 2007 until 2010 she tried out animation at Nickelodeon on the kids' classic cartoon, "SpongeBob SquarePants", a television series that has been awarded numerous primetime Emmy Awards for outstanding animated programming. In 2009, she began working as a producer in the 2009 film "Dandelion Dharma". She also produced the 2011 MTV reality television series, "Cuff’d", released August 2011.

== The Feel Good Film Festival ==
As Flores' passion is to positively influence Hollywood, she created Hollywood's non-profit Film festival, The Feel Good Film Festival, taking on responsibility for overall artistic direction including responsibility for film selection. The Festival premiered in August 2008, providing a prime platform for winning projects that are entertaining, optimistic, humorous or heartwarming and leave the audience feeling good. Flores' goal is to provide a film viewing experience for the entire family that encourages the development, production, and distribution of short or feature-length films with positive themes, happy endings, that make audiences laugh, and that capture the beauty of our world. She searches for newly produced American, international, independent, and family-friendly submissions from around the world and is responsible for bringing wider attention to independent filmmakers including those listed in the awards section at The Feel Good Film Festival. The focus is screening movies where the Festival's audience members leave the theaters feeling better than when they entered 100% of the time. To achieve this, she hunts down features with positive views on life, humor, and positive scenes where at the end of it, you’re feeling better. She created the Festival to provide audiences with laugh-out-loud comedy and ultimately for having loads of fun. The positive theme and energy of the Festival and its many high-quality films stands out amongst the sea of Los Angeles film festivals. She aims for the Festival to screen happy indie films with positive themes that lift energy levels of the audience members so they can bring that positivity back into the world they live in. "Unfortunately the news and other outlets do not focus on the `happy' ... they are used to focusing on the fear. We at FGFF hope to give an alternate view on life in media.".

== Personal life ==
Flores is active in her community, Highland Park Los Angeles, California. She and her husband, actor Dominic (Stephen) Flores, reside in Los Angeles, Highland Park, California with their daughter and three sons.

== Filmography ==
Year	Film	Role
2005	West Bank Story	On-set dresser
2005	The Playbook	Actress – Hot bar chick; production designer
2006	House at the End of the Drive	Set dresser
2006	Real vs. Reel	Actress – Esther; production designer
2006	Idol	Production designer
2006	Bagged	Actress – Laura Bushen; production assistant
2006	Heroes: Chapter One ‘Genesis’ (#1.1)	Art Department
2006	Heroes: Chapter Two ‘Don’t Look Back’ (#1.2)	Art Department
2007	McBride: Semper Fi	TV - swing
2007	7-10 Split a/k/a Strike	Production designer
2007	Shadow Puppets	Production designer
2007	Bone Dry	Production designer
2007	Heroes: Chapter Twenty-Three ‘How to Stop an Exploding Man’ (#1.23)	Art Department
2008	Blind Ambition	Production designer
2008	Ingles Ya!	Set designer
2009	Tom Cool	Set decorator
2009	Dandelion Dharma	Co-producer
2009	Square Roots: The Story of SpongeBob SquarePants	TV documentary - Self
2009	It’s a Mismatch	On-set dresser
2010	For the Good of the People	Assistant production designer
2011	Cuff’d	Producer
