= The Playbook (2005 TV series) =

American television series

The Playbook is a half-hour comedy series produced by Hip TV Inc. and hosted by Donald Faison for Spike TV.

The Playbook revolves around a typical young male trying to figure out dating and relationships as if they were plays in a sports playbook.

The original pilot for the series debuted on February 3, 2005 and featured Steve Sobel as host. When Spike TV picked up the series, Donald Faison was hired to replace Steve Sobel as the series host. No more than ten episodes were produced before the series was cancelled.
