= Steven Tsapelas =

American narrative/documentary filmmaker

- Born: Steven Tsapelas; Queens, New York, U.S.
- Education: Hofstra University
- Occupations: Writer, filmmaker
- Years active: 2003–present

Steven Tsapelas is an American writer and filmmaker best known for his work on the popular webseries We Need Girlfriends.

== We Need Girlfriends ==
In 2006, Tsapelas pitched the idea of We Need Girlfriends to his Ragtag Productions co-founders Angel Acevedo and Brian Amyot. Tsapelas wrote all eleven episodes of the popular webseries and directed MySpace, Rod vs Henry and Future Henry.

Tsapelas, Amyot and Acevedo were in development on a television version of We Need Girlfriends for Sony Pictures and CBS, to be executive produced by Darren Star, Dennis Erdman and Clark Peterson, but Tsapelas has recently confirmed the project has been cancelled.

In 2021, Tsapelas wrote and directed the feature comedy UFO Club, produced by In the Garage Productions. The film premiered in summer 2022 and is now available on multiple streaming platforms. It also won the Audience Award for Best Feature at the 2022 Long Island International Film Expo. A sequel "The Bigfoot Club" premiered in 2025.
