= Feel Good Film Festival =

The International Feel Good Film Festival
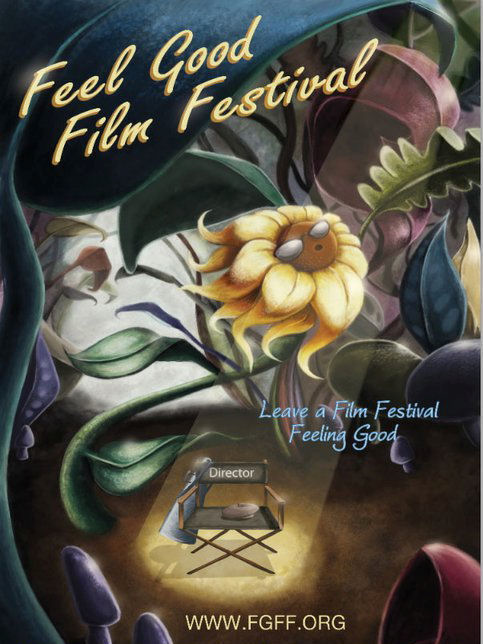
- Location: Hollywood, California, United States
- Founded: 2008; 18 years ago
- Website: http://www.fgff.org/

The Feel Good Film Festival (FGFF), also known as the Sunflower Film Festival, was held annually in Hollywood, California from 2008 to 2012. The Festival was the largest of its kind showcasing American, international, independent, and family-friendly films from all around the world that leave the audience feeling good. The FGFF was a three-day annual event held in August showcasing 60–70 feel-good feature films, short films, screenplays, and student films.

== History ==
=== Mission ===
Kristen Flores, FGFF Founder and Festival Director, established the Feel Good Film Festival. The Feel Good Film Festival began in Hollywood August 22–24, 2008, with the goal of showcasing upbeat, happy ending films. It isn't necessarily difficult to find feel-good films to screen. "They've been looking for an outlet," according to the Festival's creator, Kristen Flores. The mission of the festival is "a film viewing experience for the entire family that encourages the development, production, and distribution of short or feature length films with positive themes, happy endings, that make audiences laugh, and that capture the beauty of our world. The FGFF focuses on drawing attention to filmmakers and films that have a similar message and mission. The traditional "red carpet" gives way to a glowing sunburst carpet in keeping with the "Feel Good" theme of sunflowers that, by the way, always face the sun's rays. Certainly, with the sunburst carpet, the festivities and the films, one cannot help going away feeling kissed by the sun.

=== Notability ===
The Festival had signature "yellow" carpet entrances and international screenings. In addition, The FGFF has presented generous award packages totaling over $100,000 worth of prizes from such sponsors as Panavision, Hollywood Rentals, Final Draft, Showbiz Software, New York Film Academy, Film Independent, InkTip.com, Tuff Cut Sound and MEHRNOOSH.Those awards go to the Feel Good Film Festival's Best Feel Good Feature Film, Best Feel Good Short Film, and Best Feel Good Student Film. In addition, there are Audience Awards for Best Feel Good Feature Film and Best Feel Good Short Film. Additional awards are presented to the Best Actor, Best Actress, Best Ensemble and Best Director".

=== Celebrities honored ===
The FGFF has honored numerous celebrities, including funnyman Jonathan Winters (Certifiably Jonathan), Judd Apatow (American Storage), Oscar-winning musical star Shirley Jones (Elmer Gantry, Oklahoma!), Cheryl Hines (Curb Your Enthusiasm), Joe Ballarini (Father vs. Son), Hal Sparks (Queer as Folk), Rainn Wilson (The Office), and Carlos Mencia (Comedy Central). Other stars dotting the FGFF schedule include James Darren, Sally Field, Jorja Fox, Gregory Harrison, Cliff Robertson (Accidental Icon: The Real Gidget Story), Greta Gerwig, Iggy Pop (Art House), Daniel Baldwin, Orson Bean, Willie Garson, Clint Howard, Craig Sheffer (Ashley's Ashes), Margot Farley, Mitzi Kapture, John Saxon, Tim Thomerson (God's Ears), Anne Hathaway, Leeza Gibbons (10 Mountains 10 Years), Beth Grant (Herpes Boy), James Hong, Jenna Jameson, Ken Jeong, Josh Meyers, Krysten Ritter, Ian Somerhalder (How to Make Love to a Woman), Tim Allen, Louis C.K., Tommy Davidson, Dana Gould, Kathy Griffin, Sarah Silverman (I Am Comic) and Elaine Hendrix (The Cloggers). Also included in the celebrity lineup are Valente Rodriguez (Happily Divorced and Rizwan Manji (Outsourced).

=== Reception ===
The Feel Good Film Festival has been recognized as a "most favorite Los Angeles Film Festival". The positive theme and energy of the FGFF and its many high-quality films stands out amongst the sea of Los Angeles film festivals. Also writer, director, and actor Michael Worth ("God's Ears"; "Jabberwock"; "CSI NY"; "Desperate Housewives") praises the FGFF as it makes filmmakers dig deeper for more substance over style. Chris Getman created the Festival's website. Founding FGFF Board members include Kristen Flores, Alan Noel Vega, Natalie Chaidez, Chandler Poling, Sarah "Quigs" Quigley, and America Young; 2011–2012 FGFF Board members include Kristen Flores, Alan Noel Vega, Natalie Chaidez, Dominic Flores, John Wildman, Jenna Charles, Mr. Lawrence, Kelly Koskella, and Richard Kraft.

== Awards ==
=== 2012 ===
- Best Feel Good Feature Film: "Red Dog", directed by Kriv Stenders and produced by Nelson Woss
- Best Feel Good Short Film: "The First 70", directed by Jarratt Moody
- Best Feel Good Original Screenplay: "Getting the Business", written by Haik Hakobian
- Best Feel Good Student Film: "Chalk Talk", directed by Christopher Durenberger
- Best Director: Kriv Stenders,"Red Dog"
- Best Actor: Fabian Kruger, "Der Sandmann"
- Best Actress: Carmen Sanchez, "La Ultima Isla"
- Audience Award Feel Good Feature: "Pad Yatra: A Green Odyssey", directed by Wendy JN Lee
- Audience Award Feel Good Short: "C'est Magique", directed by Nayda Lebron, produced by Tony Chiu, Fabienne Maurer and Nayda Lebron, writer Fabienne Maurer

=== 2011 ===
- Best Feel Good Feature Film: "The Italian Key", written and directed by Rosa Karo, producer-composer Tuomas Kantelinen
- Best Feel Good Short Film: "Sudden Death", written and directed by Adam Hall, produced by Melanie Hall
- Best Feel Good Directed Film Over 60 Minutes: Valerie Weiss, "Losing Control"
- Best Feel Good Directed Film Under 60 Minutes: Mark Playne, "Love at First Sight"
- Best Feel Good Original Screenplay: "Drosselbart", written by Effie Bathen
- Best Feel Good Student Film: "Extraordinary Fight of Atticus Walker and the Monster in his Head", written and directed by Michael Karman
- Best Actor in a Feel Good Film: Bjorn Johnson, "Part Time Fabulous"
- Best Actress in a Feel Good Film: Jules Bruff, "Part Time Fabulous"
- Best Ensemble Acting in a Feel Good Film: "Sweet Little Lies", directed and produced by William Saunders
- Audience Award Feel Good Feature: "In the Key of Eli", directed by Phillip Scarpaci, produced by Pattie Kelly
- Audience Award Feel Good Short: "Aphasia"', written/directed/produced by Jim Gloster, executive producer Donna Scott

=== 2010 ===
- Best Feel Good Feature Film: "God's Ears", directed by Michael Worth
- Best Feel Good Short Film: "Butterfly Circus", directed by Joshua Weigel
- Audience Award Feel Good Feature: "10 Mountains 10 Years", directed by Jennifer Yee
- Audience Award Feel Good Short: "Maryanne Goes to the Market", directed by Ethan Cushing
- Best Feel Good Student Film: "Chinese Antique", directed by Ryo Shiina, Bassem Wahbi
- Best Feel Good Student Film Runner Up: "Flying for Mice", directed by Dana Jones, Joel Reaves
- Best Feel Good Director: Brent Florence for "Eagles in the Chickencoop", directed by Brent Florence
- Best Feel Good Actor: Byron Lane for "Herpes Boy"
- Best Feel Good Actress: Ahna O'Reilly for "Herpes Boy"
- Best Feel Good Ensemble: "Herpes Boy"
- Best Feel Good Screenplay Award: "Shinola"; Writer: Martin Garner
- Feel Good Original Song Award: "Wakiyaku Monogatari (Cast Me if You Can)", Composer: Jessica De Rooij

=== 2009 ===
- Best Feel Good Feature Film: "Dance of the Dragon", directed by John Raadel, produced by Clavin Tan
- Best Feel Good Short Film: "Lucy: A Period Piece", directed by Julie Sagalowsky
- Audience Award Feel Good Feature: "Rock Slyde", directed by Chris Dowling
- Audience Award Feel Good Short: "Grande Drip", directed by Angelo Salvatore Restaino
- Best Feel Good Student Film: "Happy Man's Pants", directed by Kunal Saykur
- Best Feel Good Webisode: "Pink Eye", directed by Brinton Bryan
- Best Feel Good Director: Jacob Medjuck for "Summerhood"
- Best Feel Good Actor: Anthony Natale for "Universal Signs"
- Best Feel Good Actress: Sabrina Loyde for "Universal Signs"
- Best Feel Good Cinematography (Panther Award): John Radel for "Dance of the Dragon"
- Best Feel Good Production Design: Ewan Dickson for "Summerhood"
- Best Feel Good Screenplay Award: "Godspeed", Writers: Travis Mann, David White & Michael Toay
- Feel Good Original Song Award: "Step on the Moon" by Skyebat (Music by Peter Calandra, Lyrics by Stephanie Batailler)

=== 2008 ===
- Best Feel Good Film: "Certifiably Jonathan", directed by Jim Pasternak
- Best Feel Good Short Film: "Mira", directed by Michael Berry
- Best Feel Good Cinematography: Jim Orr for "The Flyboys"
- Audience Award for Feel Good Feature: "The Rainbow Tribe", directed by Christopher Watson
- Audience Award for Feel Good Short: "Mira", directed by Michael Berry
- Best Feel Good Student Film (20-21 Year Old Division): "First Bass", directed by Philip Hodges, written and produced by Jonah Ansell
- Best Feel Good Student Film (19 Year Old and Under Division): "The Last Cherry", directed by Lisa Kowalski
- Best Feel Good Screenplay Award: "Hear, Boy!", Writer: Noah Edelson
- Feel Good Original Song Award: "Falling from Mars", music & lyrics: Alyssa Campbell
