= List of local children's television series (United States) =

The following is a list of local children's television shows in the United States. These were locally produced commercial television programs intended for the child audience with unique hosts and themes. This type of programming began in the late 1940s and continued into the late 1970s; some shows continued into the 1990s. Author Tim Hollis documented about 1,400 local children's shows in a 2002 book, Hi There, Boys and Girls!

The television programs typically aired in the weekday mornings before school or afternoons after school, as well as on weekends (to a lesser degree). There were different formats. Almost all shows had a stereotypical, colorful host who assumed a persona, such as a cowboy/cowgirl, captain/skipper/commodore/admiral, jungle explorer, astronaut, king/queen, prince/princess, clown, sheriff/deputy/trooper, police/cop, firefighter, hobo/tramp, railroad engineer, magician, "cousin", "grandpa" (or "grandma") or "uncle" (or "aunt"), whose role was not only to be the "DJ" (confused for a person who work on music) for syndicated material (typically cartoons, although Westerns were more popular earlier on) but also to entertain, often with a live television studio audience of kids, during breaks.

Early airing fare included copyright programming, along animation such as Koko the Clown, Tom and Jerry (now owned by Warner Bros. Discovery), Looney Tunes (now owned by Warner Bros. Discovery), Crusader Rabbit, Dick Tracy, Popeye, Rocky and Bullwinkle (now owned by NBCUniversal), Casper the Friendly Ghost (now owned by NBCUniversal), Mighty Mouse (now owned by Paramount), Deputy Dawg, Hergé's Adventures of Tintin (now owned by Corus), Mel-O-Toons, Woody Woodpecker (now owned by NBCUniversal), The Funny Company, Mr. Magoo (now owned by NBCUniversal), Space Angel and Clutch Cargo, as well as short films, such as Laurel and Hardy, Our Gang/The Little Rascals and The Three Stooges (now owned by Sony Pictures), as well as animated versions of Laurel and Hardy, Abbott and Costello and The Three Stooges, and live-action shorts, such as Diver Dan. Some included educational segments such as wildlife in Nature's Window.

== Television broadcast markets ==
=== Alabama ===
==== Anniston ====
- WHMA-TV-40, later WJSU-TV: The Cousin Cliff Show (with Cliff Holman)

==== Birmingham ====
- WVTM-TV, WAPI-TV: The Balloon Goon (with Sterling Brewer)
- WBRC: Birthday Party (with Joe Langston)
- WBRC: Bozo the Clown (Bart Darby, Ward McIntyre)
- WBRC: The Bugs Bunny Show (with Benny Carle)
- WTTO, WDBB: Cartoon Clubhouse (with Cliff Holman)
- WVTM-TV, WABT: Channel 13 Theatre (Bill Wright)
- WBRC: Circle Six Ranch (with Benny Carle)
- WIAT, WBMG: The Dick Tracy Show (with Neal Miller)
- WBRC: Quick Fire McIntyre (with Ward McIntyre)
- WVTM-TV, WAPI-TV: Romper Room ("Miss Jean", "Miss Jane", "Miss Carol")
- WVTM-TV, WAPI-TV: The Sgt. Jack Show (with Neal Miller)
- WBRC: Supersonic Sam (with Horace Pumphrey)
- WVTM-TV, WABT: Tip Top Clubhouse (renamed to Cousin Cliff's Clubhouse; hosted by Cliff Holman)
- WBRC: Uncle Bill and Spooky (with Bill Wright)
- WVTM-TV, WABT: Uncle Bill's Fun Shop (with Bill Wright)
- WVTM-TV, WABT: Western Theatre (with Benny Carle)

==== Dothan ====
- Miss Becky, Bugs Bunny, and Friends (with Becky Copeland)

==== Florence ====
- Captain Jack (with Jack Worley)
- Earline in Storyland
- WHDF, WOWL: Planet 15 (with Jack Worley)
- WOWL: The Children's Hour

==== Huntsville/Decatur ====
- WAAY-TV: 31 Funtime (with Johnny Evans)
- WAAY-TV, WMSL: The Benny Carle Show (with Benny Carle)
- Captain Barney and Popeye (with Johnny Evans)
- WOWL-TV: Earline in Storyland
- Junior Auction (with Johnny Evans)
- WMSL/WHNT-TV: Kiddie Circus (with Bill Sykes) (WMSL first aired the series in 1961, later taken over by WHNT in 1963)
- WAFG/WHNT/WMSL: Romper Room
- WMSL: Through the Looking Glass (with "Miss Dottie" Frame, 1958-1962)
- Western Theatre (with Johnny Evans)

==== Mobile ====
- Aunt Beka (Rebecca Horton)
- Bunnyville USA ("Barney Bunny")
- WALA-TV: Camp Walabear
- Captain Mal
- Captain Supreme (Earl Hutto)
- Cartoonerville ("Chuck Wagon" Charlie)
- Fun and Games (with Marcia Wanaker and Rosie Seaman)
- Junior Auction
- WEAR-TV: The Lynn Toney Show (hosted by Lynn Toney)
- WKRG: Popeye Cartoon Theatre ("Captain Hank")
- WKRG/WEAR-TV: Romper Room ("Miss Skeeter" [WKRG version]; "Miss Jackie" [WEAR version])
- WKRG: Rosie's Place (hosted by Rosie Seaman)
- Jungle Bob / Scuba Bob

==== Montgomery ====
- Cactus Cal (with Calvin Ruff)
- Captain Zoomar (with Walter Bamberg)
- Cartoon Carl (with Carl Stephens)
- Junior Auction (with Curt "Pop" Blair)
- Kartoon Karnival (with Billy Morgan, Martha Sadler)
- Popeye Theatre (with Curt "Pop" Blair)
- Princess Pat's Storybook Castle (with Pat Barnes)
- Romper Room ("Miss Bobbi", "Miss Sue")
- Western Theatre (with Bob Underwood)
- Willie the Clown (with Bill Smith)
- Young World (with Marge Payne)

=== Alaska ===
==== Anchorage ====
- KENI: Mother Moose (with Larry and Carol Beck)

==== Fairbanks ====
- School for Fun

=== Arizona ===
==== Phoenix ====
- KTVK: Cartoonland
- KTAR-TV: Romper Room ("Miss Sherri", "Miss Coleene")
- KPHO-TV: The Wallace and Ladmo Show (Bill Thompson as Wallace, Ladimir Kwiatkowski as Ladmo, and Pat McMahon as Gerald, Captain Super, other characters). Also known as "It's Wallace" and "Wallace & Company."
- KPHO-TV: The Ladmo Show (Ladimir Kwiatkowski as Ladmo)
- KPHO-TV: Gold Dust Charlie (Ken Kennedy, with Bill Thompson as Wallace Sneed)

==== Tucson ====
- KVOA: Cartoon Corral ("Chuck Waggin")
- KTTU-TV/KDTU: The Friendship Club (with Bob Love)
- KGUN: Marshal K-Gun (with Burt Oien, Jack Jacobson and Bob Love) Romper Room (with "Miss Evelyn" (San Angelo))
- KMSB-TV/KZAZ: The Uncle Bob Show (with Bob Love)
- KOLD-TV: Zipo the Clown (Zipo & Friends; starring Victor Dains Sr.)

==== Yuma ====
- KYMA-DT/KIVA: The S.S. KIVA (with Don Kenny, Bob Hardy, Elmore Eaton)

=== Arkansas ===
==== El Dorado/Monroe ====
- KTVE: Bozo the Clown (with Tommy Bush)
- KTVE: Chuckles the Clown (played by Dale Nicholson)
- KTVE: Commodore Clem (with Henry Clements)
- KNOE-TV: The Happiness Exchange
- KTVE: Romper Room ("Miss June")

==== Fort Smith ====
- KFSM-TV/KFSA: Captain Chuck (with Chuck Abraria)
- KFSM-TV/KFSA: Romper Room ("Miss Nancy")
- KFSM-TV/KFSA: Uncle Elmer (with Elmer Morris)
- KFSM-TV/KFSA: Uncle Zeb (with Jerry Davis)

==== Little Rock ====
- KRTV: Betty's Little Rascals (with Betty Fowler)
- KATV: Bozo the Clown (Gary Weir)
- KARK-TV: Bozo's Big Top (Gary Weir) (Replaced much of NBC's Saturday Morning lineup)
- KARK-TV: Candy the Clown (with Gary Weir)
- KARK-TV: Captain KARK (with Lloyd Denney)
- KKYK: Clowntown USA (with Gary Weir)
- KARK-TV: Lorenzo the Tramp (with Gerry Wheeler)
- KATV: Mr. Specs' Cartoon Caravan (with Bruce Smith)
- KATV: Romper Room ("Miss Sylvia", "Miss Linda")
- KARK-TV: Six-Gun Theatre (with Volmar "Cactus" Vick)

=== California ===
==== Bakersfield ====
- KBAK-TV, KERO-TV, KJTV-TV: Uncle Woody (with Woody Bryant)

==== Chico ====
- KHSL-TV: The Paul Bunyan Show (1963-1964) (with Richard Kiel)

==== Fresno ====
- KMPH: Uncle Woody Show (with Woody Bryant)
- KAIL: Leebo The Clown (with Leland Harris)
- KFSN: Fun Time (with Al Radka)
- KMJ: Miss Pat's Playroom

==== Glendale ====
- KHOF: Black Buffalo's Pow-Wow

==== Los Angeles ====
- KTLA-DT: Batfink (Len Maxwell)
- KTLA-DT: Beany and Cecil (Bob Clampett)
- KTLA-DT: Bozo the Clown (with Vance Colvig Jr.)
- KTLA-DT: Bozo's Circus (with Pinto Colvig)
- KTLA-DT: Buffalo Billy (with Bob Clampett)
- KTLA-DT: Cartoon Carousel (Frank Herman, a.k.a. Skipper Frank)
- KCAL-TV/KHJ-TV: Cartoon Express (with Engineer Bill, played by Bill Stulla)
- KCOP: Cartoonville
- KCAL-TV/KHJ-TV: Chuck McCann's Funstuff (with Chuck McCann, Barry Thompson, Sonny Fox)
- KABC-TV, KTTV: Chucko the Clown (with Charles M. Runyon)
- KTTV: Daphne's Cartoons
- KABC: Domingo
- KCBS-TV/KNXT: Dusty's Treehouse (Stu Rosen)
- KTLA-DT: For Kids Only (with Skipper Frank)
- KCAL-TV/KHJ-TV: The Froozles (with Sally Baker)
- KCOP: Hobo Kelly (with Sally Baker)
- KTTV: King Koopa's Kool Kartoons (Christopher Collins)
- KTLA-DT: Light Time (with James E. Stewart and Rolf Forsberg)
- KTTV: Mr. Wishbone
- KCAL-TV/KHJ-TV: Pancake Man (with Hal Smith)
- KTLA-DT: Pier Five Club (with Tom Hatten)
- KTLA-DT: Popeye and Friends (with Tom Hatten and Edwin McCormick)
- KTLA-DT: Popeye And Friends and Three Stooges Uncle Woody Show (with Woody Bryant)
- KCOP: Romper Room ("Miss Mary Ann", "Miss Socorro")
- KNBC: Serendipity (with Rudi Medina)
- KTTV: Sheriff John (with John Rovick)
- KCAL-TV/KHJ-TV: Shrimpenstein (with Gene Moss)
- KCOP: Skip and Woofer
- KCBS-TV/KNXT: Space Funnies (Dal McKennon)
- KTLA-DT: Squeaky Mulligan, the Talking Cat (with Al Jarvis)
- KNBC-TV: That's Cat (with Alice Playten)
- KTLA-DT: Thunderbolt the Wondercolt (John Carradine, Walker Edmiston)
- KTTV: Willy the Wolf (with Walker Edmiston)

==== Sacramento/Stockton ====
- KOVR: Captain Delta (early 1970s)
- KTXL: Cap'n Mitch (1970s-80s)
- KCRA: Captain Sacto (Fred Wade; 1950s)
- Capn's Locker
- Cartoonland
- KCRA: Romper Room ("Miss Nancy")
- Skipper Stu (hosted by Stu Nahan)

==== San Diego ====
- King Norman's Kingdom of Toys (with Norman Rosenburg)
- KOGO: The Johnny Downs Show (with Johnny Downs)

==== San Francisco Bay Area ====
- KRON-TV: Assignment Four (film docuseries)
- Buster and Me
- Captain Fortune
- KBHK: Captain San Francisco (Mike Cleary)
- Dapper Dan's Playhouse (with Dan McGrath)
- Fireman Frank (with George Lemont)
- Happy Birthday to You (with Lucille Bliss)
- Kippy the Kop (hosted by Dan Joffee)
- KRON-TV: The Mayor Art Show / The Popeye Show (host: Art Finley)
- KRON-TV: Mayor Art's Almanac (segment within Mayor Art Show, Art Finley)
- KTVU: Captain Satellite (Bob March)
- KTVURomper Room ("Miss Nancy" Besst, "Miss Ruby")
- King Norman's Castle
- KRON-TV: Skipper Sedley (Bruce Sedley)
- KTVU: Bits and Pieces
- KTVU: Captain Cosmic (with Bob Wilkins)
- KTVU: Captain Satellite (with Bob March)
- KTVU: Charley and Humphrey (with Pat McCormick)
- KTVU: Romper Room
- KTVU: TV Pow (with Pat McCormick)
- KTVU: Sir Sedley (Bruce Sedley)
- KTVU: Charley and Humphrey (Pat McCormick)
- KGO-TV: Aunt Lolly's Storytime (Alice Marino)
- KPIX / KGO-TV: Marshal "J" (Jay Alexander)
- KPIX: Jack's Place (Jack Hanson)
- Unknown affiliate: Cosmo's Castle

==== Visalia ====
- KMPH-TV: Uncle Woody (with Woody Bryant)

=== Colorado ===
==== Colorado Springs ====
- KRDO-TV, later KKTV: Romper Room ("Miss Betty", "Miss Diane", "Miss Susan")

==== Denver ====
- KWGN-TV: Blinky's Fun Club
- KBTV: Sheriff Scotty
- KBTV: The Clubhouse Gang
- KBTV, later KCNC-TV, later KWGN-TV: Romper Room
- KLZ: Fred & Fae
- KFEL: Fred & Fae The Soda Shop

=== Connecticut ===
==== Hartford ====
- WFSB/WTIC: Captain Bob
- WVIT/WHNB: Colonel Clown (with Joey Russell)
- WUVN/WHCT: Flippy the Clown (with Ivor Hugh)
- WUVN/WHCT: General Funn
- WFSB/WTIC: The Hap Richards Show (with Floyd "Hap" Richards)
- WFSB/WTIC: Ranger Andy (with Orville Andrews)
- WWE Network: Firefly Fun House (with Bray Wyatt)

==== New Haven ====
- WTNH/WNHC: Admiral Jack (with Guy Alyward)
- WTNH/WNHC: Captain Solomon C. Whiskers (with Mitch Agruss)
- WNHC/WTNH: Space Commander 8
- WTNH/WNHC: Kitdoodle (with Kit Adler)
- WTNH/WNHC/WHCT: Flippy the Clown (with Ivor Hugh)
- WTNH/WNHC: Happy the Clown (with Joey Russell)
- WTNH/WNHC: Mr. Goober (with Mike Warren)

=== Delaware ===
(see Pennsylvania, Maryland, and District of Columbia markets)

=== District of Columbia ===
==== Washington ====
- WWRC/WRC-TV, later WDCA: Bozo the Clown (with Willard Scott, Dick Dyszel)
- WDCA: Captain 20 (with John Kallimonis, Tony Alexis, Dick Dyszel)
- WTTG: Captain Tugg
- WTTG: Cindy Lou's Ranch (hosted by Cindy Dahl)
- WJLA/WMAL: Claire and Co Co (hosted by Claire Kress)
- WTTG: Countdown Carnival (with Bill Gormly)
- WWRC/WRC-TV: Cousin Cupcake (with Bob Porter)
- WTTG: Grandpa's Place (with Lee Reynolds)
- WTTG: Hoppity Skippity (with Jules Huber and Gordon Williamson)
- WDCA: Kids' Break (with Howard Huge)
- WJLA/WMAL: Pete and His Pals (hosted by Pete Jamerson)
- WTTG: Pick Temple (with Bob Dalton)
- WUSA (TV)/WTOP-TV: Ranger Hal (played by Hal Shaw)
- Romper Room ("Miss Lynn", "Miss Jan", "Miss Barbara", "Miss Sally", "Miss Connie", "Miss Anne")
- WWRC/WRC-TV: Sam and Friends (with Jim Henson)
- WTTG: Time for Science (with Darrell Drummond)
- WDCA: WOW (with Dick Dyszel)

=== Florida ===
==== Fort Myers ====
- WINK-TV: The Lazy Bar 11 (with "Cousin Vern" Vernon Lundquist)
- WINK-TV: Lazy Bar Club (with "Cousin Vern")

==== Jacksonville ====
- WMFJ: Here's How, (1962-1963) (with Virginia Atter and a clown known as Clark Winchester). They visited manufacturers each week to see how things are made.
- WFGA: Romper Room
- WFGA: Bozo and Skipper Ed Show, (1961–1966) Saturday mornings.
- WFGA: Popeye & Pals with Skipper Ed, weekday afternoons and Saturday mornings.

==== Miami ====
- WPLG: Duck, Duck, Goose; Arthur & Company
- WPLG: Batfink (Fridays 8:00–8:30am from January–July 1970)
- WLBW: Banjo Billy (starring Dave Herbert)
- WPST/WLBW/WPLG: Romper Room ("Miss Dolly", "Miss Joan")
- WGBS-TV: Romper Room ("Miss Barbara")
- WCKT: Romper Room ("Miss Iris")
- WCKT: Bobsville (starring Bob Clayton, later the announcer on Dick Clark's Pyramid game shows)
- WCKT: The Dungeon (with Charlie Baxter)
- WCKT: Fun Club (starring Charlie Baxter and Willie the Moose)
- WLBW: Jumpin Jack's 4 O'Clock Club (starring Jack O'Brien)
- WTVJ: The Lucky Duck Show (with Merv Griffin and Chuck Zink)
- WTVJ: Popeye Playhouse (hosted by multiple hosts) (1957–79)

==== Orlando ====
- WDBO: Romper Room ("Miss Nancy" Stilwell; Mondays [later weekdays] 9:00–9:30am)
- WLOF/WFTV: Kartoon Kapers
- WFTV: Cartoonland

==== St. Petersburg ====
- WLCY: 10 Ultimate
- WSUN-TV: Bozo the Clown
- WSUN-TV: Captain Mac
- WSUN-TV: Cartoon Carnival
- WLCY: Romper Room ("Miss June", later moved to WFLA-TV in March 1975)
- WLCY: Submarine 10
- WLCY: This Side Up

==== Tallahassee ====
- WFSU-TV: Miss Nancy's Store (with Nancy Benda)

==== Tampa ====
- WFTS-TV: David D TV (1994-2000, Saturday mornings)
- WTVT: Romper Room ("Miss Colleen"; Weekdays 9:00-9:30am from October 1955 until January 1959)
- WFLA: Romper Room ("Miss Kay", "Miss June", "Miss Alice") (Kay's version aired at 9:00–9:30am each weekday from January 19, 1959 until Spring 1961. June's WFLA version aired at 10:00-10:30am each weekday from March 31, 1975 until May 30, 1980, and Alice's version aired 10:00-10:30am each weekday from October 1980 until February 1982).

==== West Palm Beach ====
- WJNO (now WPTV): The Sheriff (with Bob Green)
- WPTV/WEAT: Romper Room
- WPTV-TV: The Man From GHOST (Global Headquarters for the Organization to Sustain Terror)

=== Georgia ===
==== Atlanta ====
- WAGA: Batfink & Ronald McDonald (Saturdays 9:00–9:30am)
- WXIA/WQXI/WLWA-TV: Billy Johnson
- WAGA: The Bugs Bunny Show (Bob Underwood as "Captain Bob", weekdays 5:30–6:00 pm; not to be confused with ABC's national program which aired on WLWA (ABC), now WXIA (NBC) at the time)
- WATL: Cartoon Club
- WAGA: Dooley and Co. (George Ellis as fictional hobo "Bestoink Dooley", weekdays 4:00–4:30 pm; Ellis appeared in the same role hosting local telecasts of horror film classics, Fridays 11:30 pm)
- WAGA: Mr. Pix (Dave Michaels, Saturdays 8:00–9:00am)
- WATL: Officer Don's Clubhouse (Don Kennedy)
- WSB-TV: Popeye Club with Officer Don (Don Kennedy, weekdays 5:00–6:00pm, then from 4:30–5:30pm; later on WATL)
- WTBS-TV: Romper Room (Weekdays 8:30am)
- WLWA-TV: Romper Room (Weekdays 9:00am)
- WLWA-TV: Skipper Ray (Ray MacKay, weekday mornings at 10:00 AM)
- WXIA/WQXI: Treehouse Club
- WXIA/WQXI: Tubby and Lester (Monday-Saturday 7:30 to 10 AM, 1968–72)

==== Augusta ====
- WATU: Bozo the Clown (weekdays 4:30–5:30 pm, 1970)
- WJBF: Trooper Terry (weekdays 5-5:30pm; later years 4:30-5pm; featured weatherman Terry Sams; 1960s-70s)
- WRDW-TV: "Hippity Hop" (weekdays 5:30-5:45; featuring William "Bill" Tennent; 1954-1957)

==== Columbus ====
- WRBL: Blast Off (V-Man, played by Jim Carlisle)
- WRBL: Col. Chick & Bozo (played by Charles "Chick" Autry and later by Marvin "Alec" Bush and Jack Morin)
- WRBL: Kiddie Castle Lane, later renamed Kid's Corner (with Bonnie Brown Elmore a.k.a. Princess Bonnie)
- WTVM: Miss Patsy's Playhouse (with Patsy Avery)
- WTVM: Mr. Play-Like's Morning Special (with Reuben Hensley)
- WRBL: Shaun O'Hoolihan (played by John "Jack" Morin)
- WLTZ: Calliope (Starring Rachel Einglett Elliott)

==== Macon ====
- WMAZ: Cartoon Club

==== Savannah ====
- WJCL (TV): Bozo the Clown (weekdays 4:30–5:30 pm)
- WTOC-TV: Happy Dan (weekdays 4-4:30 pm; originally Happy Dan & The Little Rascals, later Happy Dan & Popeye)
- WTOC-TV: Romper Room (weekdays 9-9:30 am)

==== Thomasville ====
- WCTV: Romper Room ("Miss Carolyn")

=== Guam ===
- KUAM-TV: Romper Room

=== Hawaii ===
==== Honolulu ====
KHON (Channel 2):

- Romper Room (same host as KTRG; 1964–74)

KGU/KITV/KHVH (now KITV) (Channel 4):

- Billy Boy Moonster (1968)
- Captain Honolulu (Sgt Sacto, played by Bob Smith; 1959–68)
- Rocketship 4 (with Bob Smith; 1968–70)

KGMB (Channel 9):

- Bufo the Frog and a Mynah Bird (hand puppets; early 1960s)
- Checkers and Pogo (Pogo Poge: Morgan White; Mr. Checkers: Jim Hawthorne, Dave Donnelly, Jim Demarest; May 26, 1967 – 1982)
- Jimmie Dodd's Aloha Club (early-mid-1960)
- Sailor Al (mid-1960s)

KTRG (now KHNL) (Channel 13):

- Romper Room (same host as KHON; 1962–64)

=== Idaho ===
==== Boise ====
- KID/KIDK/KTVB: The Merry Milkman (with Jack Lythgoe)
- KTVB: Romper Room ("Miss Mary" Alsager)

=== Illinois ===
==== Chicago ====
- WGN-TV: The Adventures of Blinkey
- WFLD: The BJ and Dirty Dragon Show, aka Cartoon Town (Bill Jackson)
- WGN-TV: Blue Fairy
- WGN-TV: Batfink
- WGN-TV: Bozo's Circus, later The Bozo Show and The Bozo Super Sunday Show (with Bob Bell, later Joey D'Auria)
- WGN-TV: Breakfast with Bugs Bunny (with Dick Coughlin and Ray Rayner)
- WGN-TV: Dick Tracy Crime Stopper Club (hosted by Ray Rayner)
- WBBM-TV/WBKB/WGN-TV: Garfield Goose and Friends (Frazier Thomas)
- WLS-TV: Gigglesnort Hotel (with Bill Jackson)
- WLS-TV/WBKB: Here's Geraldine (with Jim Stewart)
- WCIU-TV: Hey Colonel Frank (circa 1970, 4pm weekdays, between stock market and foreign language programming)
- WLS-TV: INK: Interesting News for Kids (circa 1972, with Fahey Flynn and Joanie Sandler, aka "Susie Streetnoise", along with a cast of various puppets)
- WGN-TV: Junior Crossroads
- WGN-TV: Junior Edition
- WBKB-TV: Junior Jamboree (later Kukla, Fran and Ollie), The Play House (with Angel Casey)
- WBKB/WCIU-TV: Kiddie A-Go-Go (with Elaine Mulqueen; not to be confused with Tampa's 10 A-Go-Go which ran during the same era)
- WGN-TV: Lunchtime Little Theatre (with Uncle Ned (Ned Locke), Uncle Bucky and Aunt Dody)
- WBBM-TV: The Magic Door (a/k/a "Beyond the Magic Door" in 1981-1984)
- WGN-TV: Paddleboat (with Ned Locke)
- WGN-TV: Ray Rayner and His Friends (Ray Rayner)
- WGN-TV: Romper Room ("Miss Rosemary", "Miss Beverly")
- WGN-TV: The Story Teller
- WBBM-TV/WBKB: Time for Fun (with Nicky Francis)
- WGN-TV: Time for Stories
- WGN-TV: Treetop House (with Debra Wuerfel, Tasha Johnson, Anita Klever, Mary Jane Clark, Jane McGrath)
- WGN-TV: What's the Answer
- WBBM-TV: Project Headstart classroom show similar to Romper Room, hosted by Miss Felice Mooney (late 60s-early 70s)

==== Peoria ====
- Bids for the Kids
- Bozo the Clown
- Captain Jinks & Salty Sam (with Stan Lonergan)
- Hobo Kelly (with Sally Baker)
- Mr. Toyman (with Gary Gresham)
- Romper Room

==== Quad Cities ====
(see Quad Cities, Iowa market)

==== Quincy ====
- WGEM-TV: "The Prairie Farms Cactus Club" (with Dick Moore as "Cactus Jim")

==== Rockford ====
- WIFR-TV: Mr. Moustache
- WIFR-TV: Romper Room
- WREX-TV: Rainbow Railroad
- WREX-TV: The Roddy Mac Show

==== Harrisburg ====
- WSIL-TV: The Funny Company with Uncle Briggs (hosted by Briggs Gordon)

=== Indiana ===
==== Evansville ====
- WEHT: The Peggy Mitchell Show (1961-1986)
- Romper Room ("Miss Annette")

==== Fort Wayne ====
- Happy's Place (1980s-90s)
- Froggy's Pad (1980s-90s)
- The Little Rascals Club (hosted by Bill Jackson)

==== Indianapolis ====
- WLWI: The Bill Jackson Show
- WHMB: Captain Hook's Pirate Adventures
- WTTV: Cowboy Bob's Corral, previously called Chuckwagon Theatre (with Bob Glaze)
- WFBM: The Harlow Hickenlooper Show (with Hal Fryar)
- WFBM: The Three Stooges Show (with Hoosier Hank, later Harlow Hickenlooper and Curley Myers)
- WTTV: Janie, previously called Popeye and Janie (hosted by Janie Hodge)
- WTTV: Popeye and Peggy (hosted by Peggy Nicholson)
- WTTV: Happy Herb
- WTTV: Ruffles' Party
- WTTV: Lunchtime Theater
- WLWI: Kindergarten College (with Pat Garrett Rooney)
- Romper Room ("Miss Julie")
- WTHR: This Side Up (with Dave Garrison & Dudley)
- WLWI/WTHR: Time for Timothy (formerly Timothy Churchmouse)

==== South Bend ====
- Kids' Adventure Zone (with Capt. Ed Friend)
- Popeye Theater (with Mike May)

==== Terre Haute ====
- WTHI-TV: Captain Jack (hosted by "Captain Jack" Haines) (1978–1982)

=== Iowa ===
==== Cedar Rapids/Waterloo ====
- KGAN-TV/WMT-TV: The Dr. Max Show (with Dr. Max Hahn)
- KGAN-TV/WMT-TV: Marshal J Show (with Jay Alexander)
- WMT-TV: Miss Ruth Ann's School
- KWWL-TV: Romper Room ("Miss Bonnie")

==== Davenport ====
(see Quad Cities market)

==== Des Moines/Ames ====
- KCCI-TV/KRNT-TV: 1-2-3 (hosted by Dolph Pulliam)
- KCCI-TV/KRNT-TV: The Breakfast Club (with Bill Riley)
- KCCI-TV/KRNT-TV: Dolph's Cartoon Corner (hosted by Dolph Pulliam)
- WHO-TV: Duane & Friend (hosted by Duane Ellett)
- WHO-TV: The Floppy Show (hosted by Duane Ellett)
- WHO-TV: Romper Room ("Miss Gloria")
- Hey Bob (with Bill Riley)
- Kadipus Land (Fred "SuPiDaK" Hiatt, "Captain Redbeard")
- WOI-TV: The Magic Window (Betty Lou Varnam)
- Romper Room
- Variety Theatre (Bill Riley)
- Volume See (Carl Williams)

==== Mason City/Fort Dodge ====
- Bart's Clubhouse (hosted by Bart Curran)
- Uncle Dick's Fun House

==== Quad Cities ====
- WQAD-TV: Bozo's Circus (with Keith Andrews)
- KWQC-TV/WOC-TV: Cactus Jim (with Bob Allard)
- KWQC-TV/WOC-TV: Cap'n Don's Cartoon Showboat (Don Warren)
- KWQC-TV/WOC-TV: Cap'n Ernie's Cartoon Showboat (with Ernie Mims)
- KWQC-TV/WOC-TV: Captain Ken's Cartoon Showboat (with Ken Wagner)
- KWQC-TV/WOC-TV: Cap'n Vern's Cartoon Showboat (with Vern Geilow)
- KWQC-TV/WOC-TV: The Circle 5 Ranch (with Walt Reno as "Cowboy Whitey")
- KWQC-TV/WOC-TV: The Circle 6 Ranch (with Wes Holly as "Cowboy Wes")
- KWQC-TV/WOC-TV: Comic CutUps (with Ken Wagner)
- WHBF-TV: Grandpa Happy (with Milt "Trader Milt" Boyd)
- WHBF-TV: Iowanna Pow-Wow (with Milt Boyd)
- WQAD-TV: Jungle Jay (with Gene King)
- WHBF-TV: The Magic Carpet (with Jan Schrage)
- WQAD-TV: Q-Deenie
- KWQC-TV/WOC-TV: Romper Room ("Miss Barbara", "Miss Gwen", "Miss Donna")
- WQAD-TV: Romper Room ("Miss Peggy")

==== Sioux City ====
- KVTV: Book Bandwagon
- KVTV: Canyon Kid's Corner (with Jim Henry)
- KVTV/KCAU: Romper Room ("Miss Candy")
- KTIV: Cartoon Time (with Gene Quilleash, Dutch Meyers)
- KTIV: Romper Room
- KTIV: Commander Four (with John Rickwa, Gene Quilleash)
- KMEG: Bingo's Big Top (with Dave Madsen)
- KMEG: Klarence the Klown (with Bill Bass)
- KMEG: Pops (with Dave Webber)
- KMEG: Puppin's Place (with Tim Poppen)

=== Kansas ===
==== Wichita ====
- KAKE-TV: Cap'n Bill (Bill McLean) and Popeye (Clarence Brown)
- KAKE-TV: Deputy Dusty (hosted by Dusty Herring)
- KAKE-TV/KTVH/KWCH-TV: Freddy Fudd (with Henry Harvey)
- KSNW/KARD-TV/KSAS-TV: Major Astro (with Tom Leahy)
- KAKE-TV: The Old Cobbler (with John Froome)
- KAKE-TV: Romper Room ("Miss Marty" and "Miss Fran")
- KAKE-TV/KWCH-TV/KTVH: Santa's Workshop (with Henry Harvey)
- KAKE-TV: Uncle Bill Reads the Funnies (hosted by Bill Boyle)

=== Kentucky ===
==== Bowling Green ====
- WLTV-TV: Uncle Albert's General Store 1962-64 (with George Goldtrap)

==== Lexington ====
- WKYT-TV: The Windy Wonderful Show 1959-65 (with Mary Ann Kuykendall)

==== Louisville ====
- WHAS-TV: Cartoon Circus (with Randy Atcher)
- WDRB-TV:Funsville (Presto The Magic Clown) (Feb. 28, 1971-?)
- WHAS-TV: T-Bar-V Ranch (with Randy Atcher, Tom "Cactus" Brooks) March 1950-April 1971
- WAVE-TV: The Magic Forest (with Ed Kallay, Julie Shaw)
- WAVE-TV: Batfink
- WLKY-TV: Bob Terry and His Pirates (1963-1967)
- WLKY-TV: Romper Room (various hostesses, 1962-1970)
- WAVE-TV: "Blue Apple Playhouse" (1977-?)

==== Paducah ====
- WPSD: Romper Room ("Miss Emily", "Miss Kay", "Miss Penny", "Miss Betsy")

=== Louisiana ===
==== Baton Rouge ====
- Storyland (1955–1988), hosted by Buckskin Bill Black (WAFB-TV)

==== Monroe ====
- The Happiness Exchange (KNOE-TV)

==== New Orleans ====
- Bozo the Clown
- Johnny's Follies (WVUE)
- Johnny's Showboat (WVUE)
- Mr. Bingle (WDSU)
- Polycarp
- Popeye and Pals (WWL-TV)
- WDSU: Romper Room ("Miss Ginny", "Miss Linda")

==== Shreveport ====
- KSLA-TV: Al's Corral, hosted by Al Bolton
- KSLA-TV: Bob and His Buddies, hosted by Bob Griffin
- KTBS-TV: Bozo the Clown
- KCMC-TV/KTBS-TV: Romper Room ("Miss Barbara" [KTBS version])
- KTAL-TV: Captain Talltower and Cartoons
- KTAL-TV/KSLA-TV: Sesame Street (In 1970, a local advocacy group was formed to fundraise to help cover the cost of bringing the program to television in the region due to the market not having an NET/PBS station. The show was moved to KSLA in February 1972 and remained on KSLA until August 1978)

=== Maine ===
==== Bangor ====
- WABI: Bozo's Circus
- WLBZ-TV: The Eddie Driscoll Show
- WEMT: Romper Room (with "Miss Nancy" Dysart)

==== Portland ====
- WGAN/WGME: Cap'n and the Kids (with Lloyd Knight)

=== Maryland ===
==== Baltimore ====
- WJZ-TV: The Bob McAllister Show
- WMAR: Bozo the Clown (with Stu Kerr)
- WMAR: Caboose (with Stu Kerr and Kevin Clash)
- WBFF: Captain Chesapeake (George Lewis)
- WBFF: Batfink
- WJZ-TV: The Lorenzo Show (with Gerry Wheeler)
- WMAR: Mr. Morning's Clubhouse (with Stu Kerr)
- WMAR: Professor Kool (with Stu Kerr)
- WMAR: Romper Room ("Miss Nancy" Claster, "Miss Sally"; also seen with "Miss Sally" in TV markets without local Romper Room shows)
- WBAL-TV: Paul's Puppets children's marionette show that ran from 1948 to 1958
- WBAL-TV: P.W. Doodle (Royal Parker), children's cartoons and Mickey Mouse Club reruns 1962-1965
- Maryland Public Television: Bob the Vid Tech (with Bob Heck) Children's Interstitials and specials 1993-2010

=== Massachusetts ===
==== Boston ====
- WBZ-TV: Boomtown (with Rex Trailer)
- WCVB, WHDH-TV: Bozo the Clown (with Frank Avruch) (also seen in TV markets without local Bozo shows)
- WLVI-TV/WKBG-TV: Bunker Hill (with Bob Glover)
- WLVI-TV: Captain Boston (with Chris Claussen)
- WSBK-TV/WIHS-TV: The Children's Hour (with Paula Dolan)
- WCVB, WHDH-TV: Commander Jet's Comedy (with Bill Harrington)
- WCVB/WHDH-TV: The Natural World with Captain Bob/ Drawing from Nature with Capt. Bob (with Bob Cottle)
- WCVB-TV: Jabberwocky (Tucker Smallwood, JoBeth Williams)
- WCVB-TV: A Likely Story (late 1980s - early 1990s)
- WHDH-TV, WNAC-TV: Major Mudd (with Ed McDonnell)
- WCVB, WHDH-TV: Romper Room ("Miss Jean")
- WHDH-TV: RTV (Ready To Go!!!) (weekday morning magazine program for children)
- Skiddle Alley (with Major Mudd)
- WBZ-TV: Small Fry Club (with Big Brother Bob Emery)
- WNEV-TV: The Story Lady (mid 1980s)
- WSBK-TV: Willie Whistle ("Dick Beach")
- WGBH-TV: ZOOM (While the program was shown on PBS stations in the US and Canada, most of its primary audience was made up of children in the Metro Boston region.)

==== Springfield ====
- WHYN: The Admiral and Swabby (with Gary Garrison, Norm Goyer)
- WHYN: Bozo the Clown
- WHYN: Cy's Weather
- WHYN: Elby's Weather
- WHYN: The Swabby Show
- WGGB-TV WHYN: Pete & Willy's Tree Hut

==== Worcester ====
- WSMW-TV: Bozo the Clown

=== Michigan ===
==== Detroit ====
- The Auntie Dee Show (with Dee Parker)
- WKBD-TV: Captain Detroit (with Sergeant Sacto)
- WXYZ-TV: Cartoon Fun
- WXYZ-TV: Hot Fudge
- Jingles in Boofland
- WXYZ-TV: Lunch With Soupy Sales (1952–1959)
- WXYZ-TV: Batfink (also known as "Wake Up with Batfink")
- Milky The Twin Pines Magic Clown
- Milky's Party Time
- Oopsy The Clown
- Popeye Theater with Captain Jolly and Poopdeck Paul
- Ricky the Clown (with Irv Roming)
- Sagebrush Shorty (with Ted Lloyd)
- Sonny Elliot
- Wixie's Wonderland (with Marv Welch)

==== Detroit Area ====
- Get Up Get Out
- Kids Enjoy Yourselves Without Drugs

==== Flint ====
- WJRT-TV: Bozo the Clown

==== Grand Rapids ====
- WZZM-TV: Bozo the Clown
- WOOD-TV: The Buck Barry Show
- WOOD-TV: Captain Woody (with Andy Rent)
- WOOD-TV: Romper Room (with "Miss Jean")

==== Kalamazoo ====
- WWMT-TV/WKZO-TV: Channel 3 Clubhouse (with Beanie Brown and Uncle Fred)

==== Lansing ====
- WJIM-TV: Ranger Jim (with John Kelly then known as Jack Kelin, who then went on to host Kelly and Company with Marilyn Turner

=== Minnesota ===
==== Austin ====
- The Uncle Robb (Buff "Uncle Robb" Setterquist KMMT Channel 6)

==== Duluth ====
- Bozo the Clown (Ray Paulsen)
- Bugs Bunny Rides Again (with Ray Paulsen; not to be confused with the Bugs Bunny short with the same name)
- Captain Q (with Jack McKenna)
- Mr. Tolliver's Travels (with Herb Taylor)
- Mr. Toot (with Ray Paulsen)
- Romper Room ("Miss Jane")

==== Minneapolis/St. Paul ====
- Axel and His Dog (with Clellan Card, Don Stolz, Mary Davies) WCCO-TV 1954–66
- Boots and Saddles (Jimmy Valentine) KSTP-TV c. 1955
- Bozo the Clown (Roger Erickson) WCCO-TV c. 1961–63
- Burn 'Em Up Barnes
- Cap'n Ken / Grandpa Ken (with Ken Wagner) KMSP-TV c. 1959–68
- Captain 11 (with Jim Lange) WTCN-TV (Ch 11) c. 1953–55 (with Chris Wedes) WTCN-TV (Ch 11) c. 1955–58
- Captain Daryl (Daryl Laub) KSTP-TV c. 1955–57
- Carmen's Cottage (with Mary Davies) WCCO-TV 1966–77
- Clancy and Company / Clancy and Willie (with John Gallos, Allan Lotsberg) WCCO-TV 1963–77
- Clancy the (Keystone) Cop (with John Gallos) WCCO-TV 1959–61
- Clancy the Space Cop (with John Gallos) WCCO-TV 1961
- Commodore Cappy (with John Gallos) WCCO-TV 1957–59
- Dave Lee and Pete (with Dave Lee) WTCN-TV (Ch 11) c. early 1960s
- Jimmy's Junior Jamboree (with Jimmy Valentine) KSTP-TV c. 1948–54
- Joe the Cook (with Chris Wedes) WTCN-TV (Ch 11) c. 1956
- Johnny .44! (with Jack Hastings) WCCO-TV c. 1956–58
- J. P. Patches / The Carnival Clown (with Daryl Laub) WTCN-TV (Ch 11) 1953–55; (with Chris Wedes) WTCN-TV (Ch 11) 1955–58
- Junior Auction (Roger Erickson) WCCO-TV c. 1963; (Roger Awsumb)WTCN-TV (Ch 11) c. 1968
- Juvenile Auction (Jimmy Valentine) KSTP-TV
- Lunch with Casey (Roger Awsumb WTCN-TV (Ch 11), 1953–1972; Chris Wedes WTCN-TV (Ch 11), 1953–58; Lynn Dwyer, WTCN-TV (Ch 11), 1958–72)
- Popeye and Pete (Dave Lee) KMSP-TV c. 1959
- Popeye's Clubhouse WCCO-TV (Mel Jass) c. 1956–57, (Dale Woodley) c. 1957–1959; (Jack Hastings) c. 1959–60
- Riddle Griddle (Jimmy Valentine) KSTP-TV c. 1948
- Roger! (Roger Erickson) WCCO-TV c. 1963
- Skipper Daryl (Daryl Laub) WTCN-TV (Ch 11) 1953–55
- T. N. Tatters (Daryl Laub) KSTP-TV c. 1955–57
- Toby's Talent Hunt (Toby Prin) WTCN-TV (Ch 4) c. 1950
- Uncle Toby's Tune Time (Toby Prin) WTCN-TV (Ch 4) c. 1949
- Wrangler Steve (Steve Cannon) WTCN-TV (Ch 11), c. 1955

==== Rochester ====
- KMMT: Uncle Rob

=== Mississippi ===
==== Columbus ====
- WCBI-TV: Funtime With Uncle Bunky (with Robert "Uncle Bunky" Williams), weekday afternoons, 1958-76

=== Missouri ===
==== Columbia/Jefferson City/Sedalia ====
- KOMU-TV: Captain Bob (with David Deering)
- KRCG-TV/KMOS-TV/KOMU-TV: Sesame Street (Due to the lack of a PBS station in Mid-Missouri, CBS stations KRCG and KMOS began premiering PBS's Sesame Street on January 4, 1971 as a weekday morning program [9:00-10:00 AM] after a spokesman for a local group replied that KRCG was confident enough for the Citizens of Sesame Street Fund could raise money that it had notified CBS of the preemption replacement of two programs. Both stations dropped Sesame Street during the first week of March 1977 due to the station's revenue losses, and the former Sesame Street slot was replaced with The New Price Is Right that originally aired in the afternoon hours. This led to major consequences on a new station for the program in the market. In April 1977, Columbia's ABC station KCBJ immediately seek funds for Sesame Street to return in Mid-Missouri planning on airing it on weekday evenings rather than weekday mornings, but failed days after announcement due to the Missouri Department of Education reported no funds in its budget available. Then NBC station KOMU came along to seek funds as well, as the staff at KOMU paid an additional $1,825 from its general operating budget to run the program. The staff at KOMU promised to only air the show briefly in its lineup due to concerns over the same reason why KRCG pulled Sesame Street off its lineup. KOMU immediately aired Sesame Street at the same slot as KRCG/KMOS as a replacement of both Sanford & Son and Hollywood Squares for a brief time from June 20, 1977 until August 31, 1977).

==== Hannibal ====
- KHQA-TV: Romper Room

==== Joplin ====
- KODE: Romper Room ("Miss Judy")
- KODE: Sesame Street (For more than a decade, KODE aired Sesame Street on weekday mornings from the early 1970s until 1986 when Springfield's KOZK launched its sister-station KOZJ. This was all due to the lack of a PBS station in the Joplin market, although Springfield received full-time PBS programming when KOZK launched in 1975).

==== Kansas City ====
- KMBC-TV: Torey and Friends (hosted by Torey Southwick)
- WDAF-TV: Western Roundup (hosted by Uncle Frito Frank)
- KMBC-TV/KBMA-TV: Romper Room

==== St. Louis ====
- KPLR-TV: Buck's Ranch
- KPLR-TV: Captain 11's Showboat (with Harry Fender), 1959-1968
- KSDK/KSD-TV: Corky's Colorama (with Clif St. James)
- KACY-TV: The Cricket and Millie (with Mildred Savage, Eleanor Donohue)
- KETC: Fignewton's Newspaper (with Leo and Dora Velleman)
- KETC: The Finder (with Sonny Fox)
- KMOV/KMOX: D. B.'s Delight (with Doug Kincaid)
- KMOV: Gator Tales (with Doug Kincaid)
- KTVI: The Little Rascals (Fred Moegle)
- KTVI: Lorenzo and Friends (with Gerald Wheeler)
- KSDK/KSD-TV: Mickey and Amanda (with Richard Clayton)
- KDNL-TV/KTVI: Mr. Patches the Clown (with Jack Miller)
- KETC: A Number of Things (with Leo and Dora Velleman)
- KTVI: Romper Room ("Miss Joan", "Miss Lois")
- KMOV/KWK: The S.S. Popeye, later named Cookie and the Captain (with Jim Bolen, Dave Allen)
- KTVI: Suzy's Playroom
- KTVI: Treehouse Time (with Jack Murdock)
- KSDK/KSD-TV: Whistle V Ranch
- KMOV/KMOX: World of Mr. Zoom (with Jack Miller)
- KSDK/KSD-TV: The Wranglers Club (with Harry Gibbs)

==== Springfield ====
- KOLR/KTTS: Birthday Party (with Rene Handley)
- KOLR/KTTS: Captain Briny (with Wayne Grisham)
- KOLR/KTTS: Romper Room ("Miss Rene")
- KYTV: The Children's Hour (with Norma Champion)
- KYTV: Sesame Street (Sesame Street aired on KYTV beginning in November 1969 due to the lack of an NET/PBS station in the Ozarks. The show originally aired at 4:00 PM but moved to 9:00 AM several months later until the launch of KOZK in 1975).
- KSPR: Sammy's Place
- KOLR/KTTS: Television Classroom

=== Montana ===
==== Billings ====
- KULR-TV/KGHL: Happy Herb (with Herb McAllister)
- KULR-TV/KGHL: Maury's Carnival (with Maury White)
- KULR-TV/KGHL: Pete and Friends (with Pete Perlain)

==== Butte ====
- KXLF: Popeye, Wallaby and Friends
- KXLF: Tots and Teens (with Paul Simitzes)
- KXLF: XL Corral (with Paul Simitzes)

=== Nebraska ===
==== Lincoln ====
- KOLN/KGIN: Cartoon Corral
- KOLN/KGIN: Romper Room ("Miss Linda")

==== Scottsbluff ====
KSTF: The Wilmer Worm Show (with June Beaman)

=== Nevada ===
Reno

` KAME Space Station 21 ( Ricky Price & Jo Anne Buchanan)

==== Las Vegas ====
- KLAS: The Bostick Western Show
- KLAS: The Cinderella Show (with Merle Bunker)
- KLAS: Commander Lee (with Jack Lehman)
- KLAS: Rascal Rabbitt (with Caroll Spinney)
- KLRJ: Romper Room (with "Miss Nancy" Merle Bunker)

=== New Hampshire ===
==== Manchester ====
- WMUR: Ring-A-Ding The Clown Show (Dwight Damon)
- WMUR: The Uncle Gus Show (with Gus Bernier)

=== New Jersey ===
- WBTB, later WTVG, then WWHT: The Uncle Floyd Show (with Floyd Vivino)

(see New York and Pennsylvania markets)

=== New Mexico ===
==== Albuquerque ====
- KGGM: Romper Room (with Joyce Marron)
- KOAT: Uncle Howdy (with Howard Morgan)
- KOAT: Uncle Roy (with Roy Will)

=== New York ===
==== Albany/Schenectady ====
- Commander Ralph (with Ralph Vartigian)
- WRGB: Freddie Freihofer Show (with Jim Fisk)
- WTEN/WCDA: Romper Room ("Miss Diane") and Popeye and the 3 Stooges with the Old Skipper

==== Binghamton ====
- WMGC-TV: Bozo the Clown (with Larry Crabb)
- WNBF-TV: The Officer Bill Show (with Bill Parker) (1964–1972)
- WNBF-TV: Popeye and the Admiral (with Len Hathaway)
- WMGC-TV: Romper Room
- WNBF-TV: TV Ranch Club (with Bill Parker) (1949–1959)

==== Buffalo ====
- WKBW-TV: The Commander Tom Show (with Tom Jolls) 1965–1991
- WKBW-TV: Rocketship 7 with Dave Thomas (1962–1978); Mike Randall, Bob Stilson, Tim Warchocki (1992–1993)
- WGR-TV: Romper Room
- WUTV: U's Place (with Craig Scime), 1996–2001

==== Elmira/Ithaca ====
- Jerry's Playhouse (with Jerry White)
- TV Clubhouse (with Coach Carl Proper)

==== New York ====
- WPIX: The Beachcomber Bill Show (with Bill Biery; Herb Bass)
- WNBC-TV: Birthday House (with Paul Tripp)
- WPIX: Bozo the Clown (with Bill Britten)
- WPIX: The Carol Corbett Show (Carol Corbett)
- WPIX: Cartoon Express (with Bill Britten)
- WPIX: Cartoon Zoo (Milt Moss)
- WNBC-TV, later WABD: The Children's Hour (with Stan Lee Broza)
- WPIX, later WNEW-TV (now WNYW): The Chuck McCann Show (with Chuck McCann and Paul Ashley)
- WNEW-TV (now WNYW): Chuck McCann's Laurel and Hardy Show (with Chuck McCann and Paul Ashley)
- WPIX: Clubhouse Gang (with Joe Bolton)
- WNYW: The D.J. Kat Show
- WNBT/WNBC-TV: Facts N' Fun (with Shari Lewis)
- WNEW-TV (now WNYW): Felix the Cat and Friends (with "Uncle" Fred Scott and Allen Swift)
- Filbert the Flea, Buster's Buddies, Tom Corbet Space Cadet, Magic Clown, Singing Lady, Mister I-magination (with Paul Tripp)
- WABD/WNEW-TV (now WNYW): Freddie the Fireman (with Ed McCurdy)
- WNTA (now WNET) Funderama (with Herb Sheldon, Arnold Stang, Morey Amsterdam)
- WABD/WNEW-TV (now WNYW): Funny Bunny (with Dick Noel)
- WNEW-TV (now WNYW): Great Bombo's Magic Cartoon Circus Lunchtime Show (with Chuck McCann and Paul Ashley)
- WCBS-TV: The Great Foodini (with Hope Bunin and Morey Bunin)
- WWOR-TV/WOR-TV: Happy Felton's Knothole Gang (with Happy Felton)
- WRCA/WNBT/WNBC-TV: Howdy Doody Show (original puppet) (with Frank Paris)
- WABD/WNEW-TV (now WNYW): J. Fred Muggs Show
- WOR-TV (now WWOR-TV): The Johnny Andrews Show (with Johnny Andrews, Paul Ashley and Chuck McCann)
- WABC-TV: Jolly Gene and His Fun Machine (with Bill Britten)
- WPIX: Joya's Fun School
- WNTA (now WNET): Junior Carnival (with "Uncle" Steve Hollis) (Sunday version of essentially same show as Junior Frolics with different host)
- WNTA (now WNET): Junior Frolics (with "Uncle" Fred" Sayles)
- WNEW-TV (now WNYW): Just for Fun! (with Sonny Fox)
- WPIX: Kartoon Klub (with Shari Lewis)
- WPIX: Laurel and Hardy and Chuck (with Chuck McCann)
- WPIX: Let's Have Fun! (with Chuck McCann, Paul Ashley and Terry Bennett)
- WOR-TV (now WWOR-TV): Little Tom Tom at the Wigwam Party (with Gene London)
- WNEW-TV (now WNYW): Lunch with Soupy Sales
- DuMont: The Magic Cottage (with Pat Meikle)
- WPIX: The Magic Garden
- WOR-TV (now WWOR-TV), later WPIX: The Merry Mailman (with Ray Heatherton)
- WOR-TV (now WWOR-TV): Merry Mailman's Funhouse (with Ray Heatherton)
- WPIX: Pancake Man (with Hal Smith)
- WCBS-TV: The Patchwork Family (with Carol Corbett and Carey Antebi)
- WPIX: Pixie Playtime
- WPIX: Popeye (with Captain Allen Swift)
- WNTA-TV (now WNET): The Puppet Hotel (with Chuck McCann and Paul Ashley)
- WABC-TV, later WNEW-TV, later WOR-TV: Romper Room ("Miss Gloria", "Miss Joan", "Miss Barbara", "Miss Louise", "Miss Mary Ann", "Miss Molly")
- WNEW-TV (now WNYW): The Sandy Becker Show
- WABD/WNEW-TV (now WNYW): Sandy Becker's Fun House!
- WOR-TV (now WWOR-TV): The Scrub Club (with Claude Kirchner)
- WPIX: Shariland (with Shari Lewis)
- DuMont: Small Fry Club (with Bob Emery)
- WNEW-TV (now WNYW): The Soupy Sales Show
- WOR-TV (now WWOR-TV): The Space Explorer's Club (with Al Hodge)
- WOR-TV (now WWOR-TV): Space Station Nine (with Chubby Jackson)
- WNEW-TV (now WNYW): Speak Out (with Sonny Fox)
- WOR-TV (now WWOR-TV): Steampipe Alley (with Mario Cantone and Judy Katchska)
- WNTA (now WNET): Studio 99½ (with Jimmy Nelson)
- WOR-TV (now WOR-TV): Super Adventure Theater (with Claude Kirchner)
- WNTA (now WNET): Super Serial (with Al Hodge and Eric Page)
- WPIX: The Surprise Show (with Hank Stohl, Morey Bunin, Jimmy Boyd)
- WCBS-TV: Terry Tell Time (with Carol Reed, Morey Bunin, Hope Bunin)
- WOR-TV (now WWOR-TV): Terrytoon Circus (with Claude Kirchner)
- WPIX: The Three Stooges Funhouse (with Officer Joe Bolton)
- WABC-TV: Tinker's Workshop (with Bob Keeshan, Dom DeLuise, Henry Burbig, and Gene London)
- WABC-TV: Time for Fun (with Joe Bova)
- WABC-TV: The Tommy Seven Show (with Ed Bakey)
- WNBC-TV: Uncle Wethbee (with Tex Antoine)
- WNBC-TV: Watch Your Child/The Me Too Show
- WNEW-TV (now WNYW): Winchell-Mahoney Time (with Paul Winchell)
- WNEW-TV (now WNYW): Wonderama (with Sonny Fox; Bob McAllister)

==== Plattsburgh ====
- Scoop O'Brian presented 1950s Superman TV episodes

==== Rochester ====
- Gary the Happy Pirate
- Romper Room ("Miss Ann", "Miss Rita")
- Skipper Sam

==== Syracuse/Auburn ====
- WNYS-TV, WCNY-TV: Ladybug's Garden (with Cathy Stampalia and Jerry Sanders)
- WTVH/WHEN-TV: Magic Toy Shop (with "Play Lady" (Jean Daugherty); "Miss Merrily" (Marilyn Hubbard) and "Eddie Flum Num" (Socrates Sampson))
- WCNY-TV: Pappyland (originally on local public access before airing nationally on TLC and select PBS member stations)
- WNYS-TV: Bozo the Clown (with Mike Lattiff)
- WNYS-TV: Romper Room ("Miss Cathy", "Miss Joan")
- WSYR-TV: Salty Sam's Super Saturday (Bill Lape)
- WSTM-TV/WSYR-TV: Saturday Showboat ("Salty Sam")

==== Utica/Rome ====
- WKTV: Bozo the Clown (with Edwin Whitaker)

==== Watertown ====
- The Danny Burgess Show
- Kiddie Karnival (with Dan Burgess)

=== North Carolina ===
==== Asheville ====
- WLOS: Mr. Bill and Bozo
- WLOS: Mr. Bill's Workshop (with Bill Norwood)

==== Charlotte ====
- WSOC: Clown Carnival (with Brooks Lindsay)
- Ever-Ever Land
- WBTV: Junior Rancho / Little Rascals Club (with Fred Kirby)
- Romper Room ("Miss Melissa", "Miss Jody", "Miss Carol")
- Sgt. Mills

==== Greenville/New Bern ====
- Romper Room ("Miss Patsy")
- WITN: Witney the Hobo
- Telestory Time with Elenor Hawkins: WFMY 1952-1958; WCTI 1963-

==== Raleigh/Durham ====
- WRAL: Bozo the Clown (with Paul Montgomery) (1958-1961)
- Frog Hollow (1981-1985)
- Time for Uncle Paul (with Paul Montgomery) (1961-1981)
- Sparks (1985-1990)
- The Androgena Show (1992-1996)
- WPTF: Barney's Army (1979-1983)

==== Greensboro/High Point/Winston-Salem ====
- Mr. Green
- WFMY: The Old Rebel and Pecos Pete Show (with George Perry, Jim Tucker and "Lonesome Lee" Marshall) (1955-1977)
- WGHP: Romper Room
- WFMY: Six-Gun Playhouse (with George Perry) (1950-1955)
- WGGT: Billy Bobb's Fun Club (with Dana Lowell)

=== North Dakota ===
==== Bismarck ====
- KFYR: Marshall Bill (with Bill Owen)
- KFYR: Romper Room (with "Miss Connie" Burnham & ""Miss Vonnie" Becker)

==== Fargo ====
- KXJB-TV: Captain Jim (with Jim Rohn)

=== Ohio ===
==== Akron ====
- WAKR-TV: Hinky Dinks
- WAKR-TV: Professor Jack

==== Canton ====
- WJAN-TV: Alfred Alligator
- WJAN-TV: Milton The Milkman

==== Cincinnati ====
- The Bean's Clubhouse (with Bud Chase)
- Captain Glenn's Bandwagon (with Glenn Rowell)
- WKRC: Commander 12 (with Glenn Ryle)
- Laff House Gang (with Lee "Louie the Louse" Fogel)
- WXIX-TV: Larry Smith Puppets (with Larry Smith)
- A Million Laughs (with Bob Shreve)
- Mr. Hop (with Dave Manning)
- Popeye & Billy
- The Popeye Show (with Bob Shreve)
- Romper Room ("Miss Kay", "Miss Paula")
- Signal Three (with Art Mehring)
- The Skipper Ryle Show (Glenn Ryle)
- The Three Stooges Show (Bob Shreve)
- WCPO-TV: The Uncle Al Show (with Al and Wanda Lewis)
- WLWT-TV: Mr. Moon's Magic Circus (short-lived, only aired for a few months in late-1981)

==== Cleveland ====
- Barnaby (with Linn Sheldon)
- WJW (TV)/WXEL-TV: By Jupiter
- WKYC/WNBK/KYW: Captain Glenn
- Captain Penny (with Ron Penfound)
- WKYC/WNBK/KYW: Cartoon Time
- WJW (TV)/WXEL-TV: Comedy Carnival
- Franz the Toymaker (with Ray Stawiarski)
- Hickory Hideout (with Cassie Wolfe and Wayne Turney)
- WKBF-TV John and Clem
- King Jack / King Jack's Toy Box
- WJW (TV)/WXEL-TV: Merry-Go-Round
- Mr. Jingeling
- WKYC/WNBK/KYW: Popeye Theater with Mister Mac
- WEWS: Romper Room ("Miss Barbara")
- WEWS/WXEL-TV: Star Babes (1951–53)
- Tip Top Clubhouse (with Dom DeLuise)
- Uncle Jake (with Gene Carroll)
- Uncle Jake's House (with Gene Carroll)
- Woodrow the Woodsman (with Clay Conroy)

==== Columbus ====
- ACTV/Access 21: BeBe the Clown
- WCLS-TV: Crystal Palace (with Nina Gilbert)
- WBNS-TV: Flippo the Clown (with Bob Marvin)
- WTTE-TV: Fox28 Kids' Club (with Yolanda Harris)
- WBNS-TV: Luci's Toy Shop (with Lucille Gasaway)
- WTVN/WSYX: Romper Room (1955–1988)
- WTTE-TV: TV28 Kids' Club (with Susan Gilbert)
- WINJ-LP: TV8 Kids' Fun Festival (with Ella Flowers, also known as 'Pink Morning Cartoon')

==== Dayton ====
- WHIO-TV: Charlie Goodtime (with Dave Eaton)
- WKEF-TV: Clubhouse 22 (with Malcolm Macleod, "Dr. Creep")
- WHIO-TV:Ferdy Fussbudget (with Ken Hardin)
- WHIO-TV:Nosey the Clown (with Jack Jacobson)
- WKEF-TV:Romper Room ("Miss Jo" (Jo Corey), "Miss Anne")
- WKEF-TV:Toody the Clown
- WHIO-TV:Uncle Orrie (with Joe Rockhold)
- WKTR-TV: Kim's Kartoon Kapers (with Kim Christy)
- WKTR-TV: Batfink

==== Lima ====
WIMA-TV:

- The Barry Patch (with Barry Lillis)
- Charlie's Cartoon Clubhouse (with Chuck Osburn)
- For Kids Only (with Sam Fitzsimmons)
- IN-SIDE with Ron Blazer and Charlie Chunk (Chuck Osborn)

==== Springfield ====
- WSWO-TV: Bozo the Clown (with Dave Eaton)
- WSWO-TV: Lighthouse Louie

==== Steubenville ====
- Creegan and Crow

WSTV: Romper Room ("Miss Sandra")

==== Toledo ====
- Captain Cotton and Salty (with Jerry Carr)
- Fun Farm
- Patches and Pockets
- Salty's Cartoon Party
- WTOL: Romper Room ("Miss Ann")

==== Youngstown ====
- WKBN-TV: Romper Room ("Miss Anne", "Miss Margaret", "Miss Rosemary")
- The Captain Hal Fryer Show
- Clancy's Tip Top Club House
- WFMJ-TV: Sesame Street (Sesame Street aired on WFMJ from November 1969 until September 1981. The market first had a lack of a NET/PBS station until the launches of both WNEO in May 1973 and WEAO in September 1975. WFMJ continued to air Sesame Street on weekdays due to the lack of weekday morning programming on both WNEO and WEAO. This lasted until September 1981 when both WNEO and WEAO began running weekday morning programming.

=== Oklahoma ===
==== Oklahoma City ====
- WKY: 3-D Danny (with Danny Williams)
- WKY: Circle 4 Ranch Foreman Scotty
- KOCO: Lunch With Hoho (with Hoho the Clown)
- KWTV, KOCO: Romper Room

==== Tulsa ====
- KJRH: Big Bill and Oom-A-Gog (with Bill Blair)
- KTUL: Captain Ben (with Bob Jernigan)
- KTUL: Dr. Ding A Ling's Cartoon Laboratory
- KTUL: Romper Room ("Miss Nancy", "Miss Donna", "Miss Peggy")
- KOTV: The Kids Carnival (with Bob Latting)
- KOTV: Lee Woodward and King Lionel
- KOTV: The Lorenzo Show (with Gerald Wheeler)
- KTUL: Mr. Zing and Tuffy (with John Chick and Wayne Johnson), 1963–71
- KOTV: Spanky's Clubhouse (with Spanky McFarland; 1950s)
- KTUL: Uncle Zeb's Cartoon Camp
- KTUL: Uncle Zip's Do Da Day!
- KOTV: Zeta, on Satellite Six (with Jim Ruddle)

=== Oregon ===
==== Eugene ====
- KVAL-TV: Addie Bobkins (with Bob Adkins), 1957–1961
- KVAL-TV: Captain Shipwreck (with Gordon Bussey) 1961-1967
- KEZI-TV: Jack's Kartoon Clubhouse
- KEZI-TV: Mr. Fixit (Tom Stanford and Dave Weinkauf)
- KVAL-TV: Red Reynolds, 1954–1957

==== Portland ====
- KPTV: Addie Bobkins (with Bob Adkins), 1961–64
- KPTV: Bar 27 Corral (with "Heck" Harper) 1950s
- KPTV: Bent Nails (with Gene Brendler), early 1960s (Temporary replacement for injured Rusty Nails)
- KATU: Bumpity
- KOIN: Cartoon Circus with "Mr. Duffy" (played by Frank Kincaid), 1958–71
- KATU: Cartoonival with Rusty Nails mid-1960s
- KPTV: Dr Zoom (with George Ross, "Mad Scientist" character) Mid-1960s.
- KPDX: Galaxy Robot
- KGW: "Heck" Harper Early 1960s.
- KPTV/KOIN: Mister Moon (with Ed Leahy), 1955–1958
- KPTV: The Ramblin' Rod Show (with Rod Anders) 1960s/1997
- KATU: Romper Room 1950s (Varying hosts.) 1950s/ Early 1960s.
- KATU/KPTV: Rusty Nails (with Jim Allen; hosted Three Stooges shorts) Late 1950s - Early 1960s.
- KPTV: Uncle Charlie (with Charlie LaFranchise. Railroad Engineer host of Round House, model trains & cartoons, late 1950s/early 1960s)
- KPTV: Uncle Charlie's Den 1962-?? (with Charlie LaFranchise)
- KOIN: Saddlepals (with Red Dunning), 1953–55
- KATU: Popcorn (1984)

=== Pennsylvania ===
==== Erie ====
- The Pappy Show (with Skip Lecher)
- WSEE-TV: Marcie McBean and The Mickey Mouse Club

==== Harrisburg/Lancaster ====
- Cowboy Pete (Paul Baker)
- Percy Platypus and Friends (aka Per-Ki Place) (with Marijane Landis and Jim Freed)
- Pete McTee's Clubhouse
- Romper Room ("Miss Marcia")
- Sunshine Corners (with Marijane Landis)
- Tricky Ricky and Popeye

==== Johnstown/Altoona ====
- WJAC: Romper Room ("Miss Sally", "Miss Patty")
- Sy Seaweed's Popeye Playhouse (with Charlie Ritchey)

==== Philadelphia ====
- Adam Android (with Aldo Farnese)
- Al Alberts Showcase (with Al Alberts)
- Bertie the Bunyip (with Lee Dexter)
- Big Top (with Jack Sterling)()
- Breakfast Time (with Wee Willie Webber)
- Candy Apple News Company (with Matt Robinson)
- Captain Noah and His Magical Ark (with W. Carter Merbreier and Patricia Merbreier)
- Captain Philadelphia (with Stu Nahan)
- Carney C. Carney (with Harry LeVan)
- Cartoon Comics
- Cartoon Corners (with Gene London)
- Cartoon Party (with Pauline Comanor)
- Challenge (with Anita Klever)
- Chief Halftown (with Traynor Halftown)
- The Horn and Hardart Children's Hour (with Stan Lee Broza)
- C'mon to Uncle Pete's (with Pete Boyle)
- Dickory Doc (with Aldo Farnese)
- Frontier Playhouse (with Pete Boyle)
- Fun House (with Pete Boyle)
- The Ghost Rider (with Robert Olander)
- Grand Chance Roundup (with Gene Crane)
- Happy the Clown (with Howard Jones)
- In the Park (with Paul and Mary Ritts and Bill Sears)
- Jack Valentine's T-K Ranch (with Jack Valentine)
- KYW-TV: The Lorenzo Show (with Gerry Wheeler)
- Lunch with Uncle Pete (with Pete Boyle)
- Mr. Rivets (with Joe Earley)
- Pete's Gang (with Pete Boyle)
- WCAU-TV: Pixanne (with Jane Norman)
- Popeye Theater (hosted by Sally Starr)
- Ranger Joe (with Jesse Rogers)
- Rex Trailer's Ranch House (with Rex Trailer)
- Romper Room ("Miss Claire")
- Sawdust Sam (with Howard Ennis)
- Shorty the Clown (with Bill Hart)
- Sidewalk Science (with Gerry Wheeler)
- Surprise Shop (with Pete Boyle)
- Tottle (with Jane Norman)
- Wee Willie Webber Colorful Cartoon Club (with Wee Willie Webber)
- Willie the Worm (with Warren Wright)
- The World Around Us (with Anita Klever)

==== Pittsburgh ====
- WTAE-TV: Adventure Time (with Paul Shannon)
- WTAE-TV: Cappelli & Company (with Frank Cappelli)
- Captain Jim
- WIIC/WPXI: Capt. Jim's Popeye Club (with Ted Eckman)
- WPTT: Captain Pitt (with George Lewis) (same as Captain Chesapeake)
- WIIC/WPXI: Cartoon Colorama (with Don Riggs)
- The Children's Corner (Josie Carey and Fred Rogers)
- KDKA-TV: Funsville (with Sterling Yates, Josie Carey)
- WDTV: Happy's Party (with Ida Mae Maher), DuMont, 1952–53)
- KDKA-TV: Josie's World (with Josie Carey)
- WQED: Mister Rogers' Neighborhood (with Fred Rogers)
- WTAE-TV: Ricki & Copper (with Ricki Wertz)
- WTAE-TV: Romper Room ("Miss Jan")

==== Scranton/Wilkes-Barre ====
- Buckskin Jim (Jim Ward)
- Captain Orbit (Jim Ward)
- The Land of Hatchy Milatchy (with Nancy Berg and Judy Burns)
- Romper Room ("Miss Marion" and "Miss Mary Ruth")
- Rosco the Clown (with Frank LaBarr)
- Showboat (with Nancy Berg)
- Topper's Clubhouse
- The Uncle Ted Show (with Ted Raub)

=== Rhode Island ===
==== Providence ====
- Commander Jet
- Cowboy Hank (with Hank Bouchard)
- Draw Podner
- Hey Wake Up
- WJAR: Hippity Hop (The Cartoon Cop)
- WNAC-TV: Bozo the Clown
- The Little Circus
- Romper Room ("Miss Bonnie")
- WTEV-TV: Batfink
- WPRI-TV: Salty Brine's Shack (with Salty Brine)
- WPRI-TV: Salty's Funny Company (with Salty Brine)
- Storytime (with Beth Chollar)
- Sunday Funnies

=== South Carolina ===
==== Charleston ====
- The Adventure Lady (with Anna Lee Smalls)
- Commodore Moore
- WCSC-TV:Happy Raine (with Lorraine "Rainey" Evans)
- Princess Charleen (with Charleen Carrel)
- WCSC-TV: Uncle Charlie's Playhouse (with Charlie Hall)

==== Columbia ====
- Aboosa Ya Ya
- Cactus Quave (with Mackie Quave)
- Deputy Billy (with Allen Sloan)
- The Jolly Jim Show (with Jim O'Shea)
- WIS-TV: Mr. Knozit (with Joe Pinner)
- Princess Pat (with Pat Bouknight)
- Stanley And The Stooges

==== Florence/Myrtle Beach ====
- WBTW-TV ( Captain Ashby with Ashby Ward)
- WBTW-TV ( Spaceship C-8 with Dick Taylor),
- WEYB-LP ( Fox 56 Kids Club with Sly Fox)

==== Greenville/Spartanburg ====
- WSPA-TV: Captain Jack and Mr. Dutch (with Jack Six and Rene Royaards)
- The Little Rascals (with Monty DuPuy)
- Sunday Island (with Jack Six and Rene Royaards)
- WSPA-TV: Tim the Squirrel / Mr. Dutch (with Rene Royaards)

=== South Dakota ===
==== Rapid City ====
- Captain Glenn's Fun Wagon (with Glenn Rowell)
- The Jolly Postman (with John Clement)

==== Sioux Falls ====
- Bozo the Clown (with Pat Tobin)
- KELO-TV: Captain Eleven (with Dave Dedrick) (1955–96)
- Junior Auction (with Roger Russell)
- Romper Room ("Miss Carolyn")

=== Tennessee ===
==== Chattanooga ====
- WDEF TV: Mr. Chickaroonie (with Warren Herring and Mildred Gaither; 1953-1955)

==== Jackson ====
- WBBJ/WDXI: The Cousin Tuny Show (with Doris Freeman as Cousin Tuny)
- The Sheriff Big Jim Show

==== Knoxville ====
- Bozo the Clown (Johnny Mountain) (WTVK)
- Popeye Show (Mike Thurman) (WATE)
- Romper Room (WTVK)

==== Memphis ====
- Bozo the Clown
- WMCT-TV: The Looney Zoo (with Harry Mabry as Looney Zookeeper, later Trent Wood)
- Magicland (Dick Williams)
- Romper Room

==== Nashville ====
- WSM-TV: Bozo The Clown (Tom Tichenor) Later, on WSIX-TV by a different personality.

=== Texas ===
==== Abilene ====
- KRBC: Cousin Pogo and Calvin Kiwi

==== Amarillo ====
- KGNC-TV: Captain Kidd (with Allen Shifrin)

==== Austin ====
- The Uncle Jay Show (with Jay Hodgson)

==== Beaumont/Port Arthur ====
- Cowboy John (with John Garner)

==== Corpus Christi ====
- KZTV: Uncle Bob's Playhouse

==== Dallas/Fort Worth ====
- Cartoon Clubhouse
- KXAS: The Children's Hour (with Bill Kelley) (1970–92)
- The Frito Kid (with Bob Stanford)
- WBAP-TV: Bobby Peters Show (1950's; with Bobby Peters)
- WFAA: Mr. Peppermint (1961–69) and Peppermint Place (1975–96) (with Jerry Haynes)
- WFAA: Romper Room ("Miss Elaine")
- KTVT: Slam Bang Theatre (with Bill "Icky Twerp" Camfield)
- The Webster Webfoot Show (with Jimmy Weldon)
- KMEC/KBFI-TV: Bozo the Clown
- KXTX: Whistlestop Theatre (1977)
- KXTX: The Good Time Gang (1977–78) (with Frank Kurtz and Daryl Kurtz; the clubhouse setting and a sign reading the show's title was also demonstrated during KXTX's Cartoon Clubhouse in the 1980s)

==== El Paso ====
- KDBC-TV: Bozo's Big Top
- KELP/KVIA: Cadet Don (with Al Eisenmann)
- KDBC-TV: Red Brown and Anna Lee
- KELP/KVIA: Romper Room
- KTSM-TV: Sesame Street (While this program was shown on NET/PBS stations in the US, the show was aired on KTSM-TV from 1969, due to El Paso not having have a NET/PBS affiliated station until 1978 when KCOS went on the air. KTSM-TV also picked up Mister Rogers' Neighborhood due to the same reason.)

==== Houston/Galveston ====
- Cadet Don (with Al Eisenmann)
- Happy Hollow (with Mary Jane Vandiver)
- Kiddie Troopers (with Don Mahoney and Jeanna Clare)
- KTRK-TV: Kitirik (with Bunny Orsak) (1954–71)
- Mary Jane's Magic Castle (with Mary Jane Vandiver)
- No-No the Clown

==== Lubbock ====
- KDUB: Admiral Foghorn (with Paul Archinal and Trixie Bond)
- KDUB/KMBK: Sunshine Sally (with Joyce White)

==== Odessa/Midland ====
- Romper Room ("Miss Judy")

==== San Antonio ====
- Captain Gus (Joe Alston)
- Johnny's Treehouse (Johnny Dugan)

Howdy Doody 1951 Chester Howard Little Rascals 1951 Chester Howard Roy Rogers 1951. Chester Howard Gene Autry. 1951. Chester Howard

=== Utah ===
==== Salt Lake City ====
- KSL TV: Admiral Bernie with Bernie Calderwood
- KUTV: Aunt Lolly's Storytime
- KCPX: Captain Scotty
- KSL TV: Engineer Ron with Ron Ross
- KCPX: Fireman Frank
- KCPX/KTVX TV: Hotel Balderdash
- KCPX: KC's Club
- KSL TV: Kimbo the Clown with Jack Whitaker
- KSL TV: Lucky Pup
- KSL TV: Princess MakeBelieve with Alene Dalton
- KSL TV: Romper Room with Miss Nancy (Jackie Nokes), and Miss Julie (Edna Andersen)
- KSL TV: Sheriff Jim with John Lugt
- KSL TV: Story Princess with Alene Dalton
- KSL TV: Uncle Roscoe with Roscoe Grover

=== Vermont ===
==== Burlington ====
- WCAX: Polar Bear Theatre
- WCAX: Romper Room (with "Miss Pat" Nilsson)

=== Virginia ===
==== Norfolk/Portsmouth ====
- WVEC: Bungles the Clown
- WAVY: Poop Deck Pappy (Mac McManus)
- WVEC: Romper Room ("Miss Connie")

==== Richmond ====
- Romper Room ("Miss Joan")
- Sailor Bob

==== Roanoke/Lynchburg ====
- WLVA: Cactus Kids Club (with George Weeks)
- WDBJ-TV: Cartoon Theatre
- WSLS-TV/WDBJ-TV: Romper Room ("Miss Eisle" [WSLS], "Miss Jane" [WDBJ])
- WSLS-TV: Cactus Joe

=== Washington, D.C. ===
- WRC-TV: Sam and Friends (1955–61) (debut of the Muppets and Kermit the Frog).
- WTTG: Captain Tugg (early 1960's)
- WMAL-TV: Clair and CoCo

=== Washington ===
==== Bellingham ====
- KVOS: Frisky Frolics (1970s-1980s)

==== Everett ====
- Channel 3/Everett Cablevision: Jaycee Clown Show (with Crash the Clown (Nik Boldrini) and Captain Fuzz (Richard Boldrin) (1971–72))

==== Seattle/Tacoma ====
- KCPQ/KTVW-TV: Flash Blaidon
- KCPQ/KTVW-TV: Sheriff John
- KCPQ: Captain Sea-Tac
- KING-TV: King's Klubhouse (Stan Boreson)
- KING-TV: Sheriff Tex
- KING-TV: Wunda Wunda (Ruth Prins)
- KIRO-TV: J. P. Patches (Chris Wedes)
- KIRO-TV: Sheriff Shot Badly
- KOMO-TV: Boomerang (Marni Nixon)
- KOMO-TV: Captain Puget (Don McCune)
- KSTW/KTNT: Brakeman Bill's Cartoons (with Bill McLain)
- KSTW/KTNT: Robot Roundup
- KSTW/KTNT: Romper Room
- KSTW: Ranger Charlie's Kids Club

==== Spokane ====
- KREM: Captain Cy Show (late 1950s/early 1960s) (Host: David Cyrus Page, ran Popeye cartoons).
- KHQ: Romper Room ("Miss Florence") (Late 1950s/ Mid 1970s).
- Cosmic Cable: ("Sally Jo Clapper") (Cox Cable local Original children's program) (1988-1991).

==== Yakima ====
- KAPP-TV/KAPP: Mr. Bob's Cartoon Classics (Bob Ivers)
- KIMA: Uncle Jimmy's Clubhouse (Uncle Jimmy Nolan)
- KIMA: Uncle Jimmy's Story Hour (Uncle Jimmy Nolan)

=== West Virginia ===
==== Charleston/Huntington ====
- Mr. Cartoon (with George Lewis and Julian Huffman; 1970-1995)
- Steamboat Bill (George Lewis)
- Romper Room ("Miss Marilyn" Fletcher)

==== Parkersburg ====
- WTAP: PMA Pulse (with Todd Baucher)

==== Wheeling ====
- Comedy Time
- Creegan & Crow (hosted by George Creegan)
- WTRF: Romper Room

=== Wisconsin ===
==== Eau Claire ====
- The Sheriff Bob Show
- WEAU-TV: Romper Room ("Miss Shirley")

==== Fond du Lac ====
- KFIZ-TV: Sesame Street (Despite the show airing on NET/PBS in much of the US, KFIZ aired Sesame Street from 1969 until the launch of WPNE-TV in 1972 due to the Fond du Lac area not having a PBS station).

==== Green Bay ====
- WBAY-TV: Captain Hal
- WBAY-TV: Colonel Caboose
- WLUK-TV: Romper Room ("Miss Sherri")
- WLUK-TV: Sesame Street (Despite the show airing on NET/PBS in much of the US, WLUK aired Sesame Street from 1969 until the launch of WPNE-TV in 1972 due to the Green Bay area not having a PBS station).

==== Madison ====
- WISC-TV: Circus 3 (with Howie Olson & Cowboy Eddie)
- Cousin Sam
- WHA-TV: The Friendly Giant (with Bob Homme)
- WKOW-TV: Marshall the Marshall (with Marsh Shapiro)
- WMTV: Romper Room ("Miss Judy")

==== Milwaukee ====
- WITI-TV: Albert & Friends
- WISN-TV: Bozo the Clown
- WCGV-TV: Bozo's Breakfast Club
- WITI-TV: Cartoon Alley
- WMVT-TV: Children's Fair
- WISN-TV: Dick Tracy with Sergeant Lee
- WITI-TV: Funny Farm
- WTMJ-TV: Kid's Klub
- WISN-TV: Lippy Lucy with Bob Trent
- WITI-TV/WUHF-TV: Mac the Mailman
- WISN-TV: Pops' Theater
- WISN-TV/WITI-TV/WVTV: Romper Room
- WOKY-TV/WTVW/WISN-TV: Uncle Hugo
- WITI-TV: You & I

==== Wausau ====
- WSAU-TV: Romper Room ("Miss Maureen", "Miss Elizabeth")
- WAOW/WAEO: Sesame Street (Despite being shown on NET/PBS stations in the US, the show was aired on WAOW from 1969 until 1972 and on WAEO from 1974 until 1976, due to most of northern Wisconsin not having a NET/PBS affiliated station with the exceptions of Duluth-Superior (due to the area having its own NET/PBS station) and Eau Claire-Chippewa Falls (due to cable systems and over-the-air antennas can easily receive KTCA in the area) until the launch of WHRM-TV in 1976).

=== Wyoming ===
==== Casper ====
- The Fun Ranch (Jack Slothower)
- Tumbleweed (with Dick Frech)

==== Cheyenne ====
- KGWN: Captain 5
- Timmy O'Toole

== See also ==
- Children's television series
- For Kids' Sake
