= Tom Leahy =

Tom Leahy may refer to:

- Tom Leahy (Australian footballer) (1888–1964), Australian rules footballer for North Adelaide and West Adelaide
- Tommy Leahy (footballer) (1870–1916), Australian rules footballer for Essendon
- Tommy Leahy (Kilkenny hurler) (1907–1978), Irish hurler
- Tom Leahy (hurler) (born 1964), Irish hurler for Kilkenny
- Tom Leahy (baseball) (1869–1951), American baseball player
- Tom Leahy (athlete), Paralympic athlete from Ireland
- Tommy Leahy (Tipperary hurler) (1905–1981), Irish hurler
- Tom Leahy (English footballer) (born 2004), English footballer
- Tom Leahy Jr., played Major Astro on Major Astro, a children's television show in Wichita, Kansas
- Thomas Leahy, pioneer in early Cedar Mill, Oregon
