= Atcher =

Atcher is a surname. Notable people with the surname include:

- Bob Atcher (1914–1993), American musician
- Randy Atcher (1918–2002), American musician
