= Sheriff John =

American television series

John Rovick
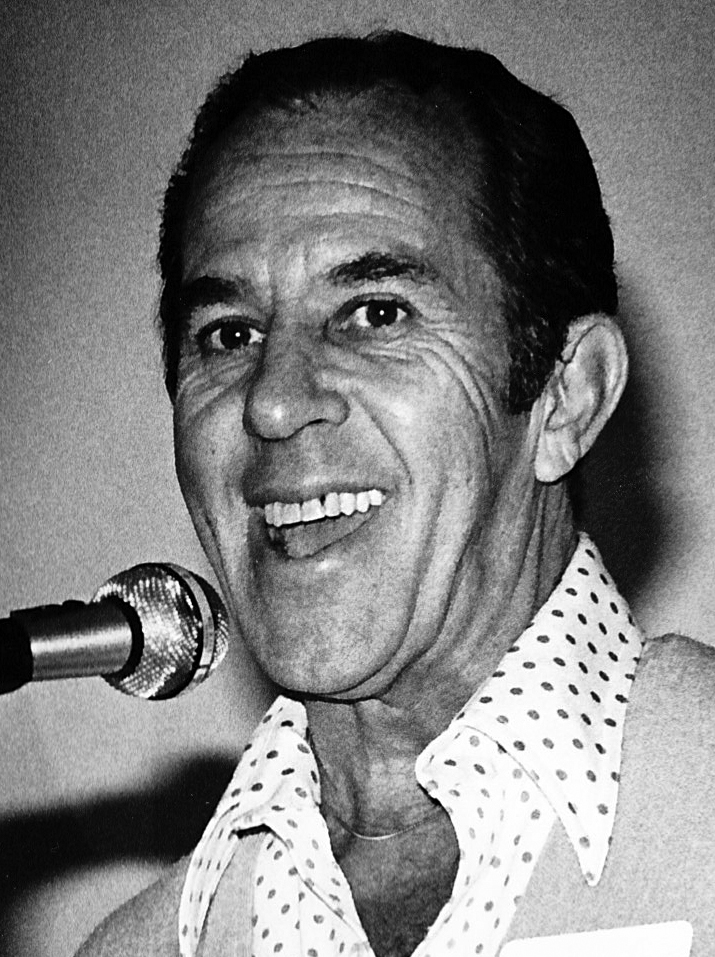
- John Rovick in the early 1980s
- Born: 2 October 1919; Dayton, Ohio
- Died: 6 October 2012 (aged 93); Boise, Idaho
- Occupation: TV Host
- Years active: 1952–1970
- Spouse: Jacqueline (separated)
- Children: 2

Sheriff John was an American children's television host who appeared on KTTV in Los Angeles from July 18, 1952, to July 10, 1970, on two separate series, Sheriff John's Lunch Brigade and Sheriff John's Cartoon Time. He was played by John Rovick who served as a radio operator-gunner in the United States Army Air Corps in World War II, surviving 50 combat missions in the European Theater of Operations. After the war he became a radio announcer, moving to television in its early days. He developed the program's concept himself.

As Sheriff John he began each program entering his office, singing "Laugh and be happy, and the world will laugh with you." He then said the Pledge of Allegiance and read a safety bulletin. He showed cartoons including Q.T. Hush, Underdog, Crusader Rabbit, and Porky Pig; he was often visited by farm animals. An artist, Sketchbook Suzie, drew pictures requested by viewers; he would complete squiggles sent by the children and make a squiggle for them to complete. He also gave them lessons on safety and good health habits.

The show's highlight was the birthday celebration. Sheriff John read as many as 100 names, then brought out a cake and sang the Birthday Party Polka ("Put Another Candle on my Birthday Cake"). The Sheriff John Show also had a segment which included a Large Tombola. Children would send their name to the TV station to Sheriff John. The piece of paper with your name on it would join hundreds of names on paper in the Tombola. Sheriff John would spin it with the wooden handle and choose a name. In the year 1966 Sheriff John pulled out the name Rosemary Soto, then four years old, and sent her a Thumbelina Doll.

In 1979, Rovick reprised his Sheriff John character on KTTV, briefly hosting a Sunday morning version of the TV series, TV POWWW. He won an Emmy Award in 1952 and appeared on the Emmy broadcast in 1998, introduced by longtime fan Michael Richards. In 1981 Rovick retired from KTTV after 32 years. On October 6, 2012, he died in Boise, Idaho, after a brief illness. He had just turned 93 years old.

== See also ==
- List of local children's television series (United States)
