= Daryl Laub =

Daryl Laub (April 12, 1925 – August 28, 2015) was an American television and radio personality who worked for stations in the Twin Cities region of Minnesota, from the 1950s until his retirement in 1993. He worked in a variety of different roles and created several children's show characters, including "J. P. Patches"

== J. P. Patches ==
In 1953 he joined WTCN, channel 11, (now KARE) where he first created his "Skipper Daryl" character. Later that year, the clown "J. P. Patches" premiered. He played the role for two years until crosstown rival KSTP-TV, channel 5, hired him away. Chris Wedes took up the Patches character when Laub left and eventually carried him to KIRO-TV in Seattle, Washington (1957). J. P. Patches inspired a similar character on Portland TV called "Rusty Nails".

== Later career ==
Meanwhile, at KSTP TV, Laub changed his clown to become "T. N. Tatters" and changed his nautical character to "Captain Daryl". His shows were scheduled back-to-back, so he had to do a quick costume and makeup change in order to play both of them each day. Captain Daryl & J.P. Patches were the first costumed children's TV personalities in Minneapolis-St. Paul and were also among the first in the area to be broadcast in color.

After his stint on television, he went on to work in KSTP's radio division, then spent nearly thirty years at KQRS-FM (ABC Radio) where he worked in sales and eventually became the station manager.

The Pavek Museum of Broadcasting honored Laub's contribution to the region by entering him into their Hall of Fame in 2003.
