= Briggs Gordon =

Michael Briggs Gordon (July 29, 1949 – February 12, 1988) was an American television host who was best known throughout the areas of Southern Illinois, Western Kentucky, Southeast Missouri, and surrounding states as "Uncle Briggs". He hosted a children's show on WSIL TV-3 in Harrisburg, Illinois, until 1982.

Gordon took over for Cactus Pete on the Funny Company broadcast in the 1970s. His show featured characters, "Funny Company News", Three Stooges shorts, and cartoons such as Deputy Dawg.

== See also ==
- List of local children's television series (United States)
