= Popeye Theater with Mister Mac =

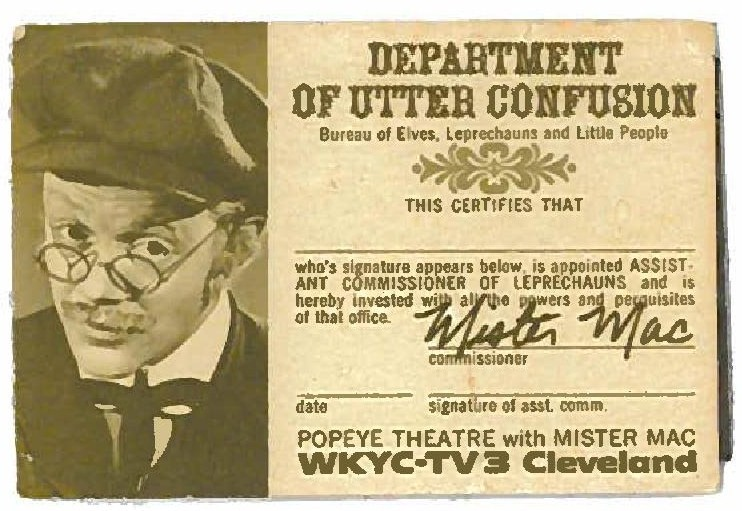

The Popeye Theater with Mister Mac is a local children's television show that aired on Cleveland's WKYC-TV from 1968 until 1971. The program was hosted by a character named Aloysius T. MacGillicuddy (or Mister Mac), played by Cleveland actor Leif Ancker.

Mister Mac's version is the second Popeye Theatre adaption in children's television in Cleveland, following the dissolvement of a first Popeye Theatre hosted by early Cleveland television duo Woodrow and Barnaby (later just Barnaby) that same year after two years. Several years after the Mister Mac version ended its run on June 19, 1971, a short-lived rebadged version of the Popeye Theatre made a reboot on WKYC's lineup in 1978, but its reboot ended its run by the end of the year.

Mr. Mac lived in a tree and served as the "Commissioner of the Bureau of Elves, Leprechauns and Little People" in the "Department of Utter Confusion." Popeye cartoons were interspersed with skits featuring Mr. Mac and his upstairs neighbor, Clyde Moose. Some earlier episodes contain runs of children's movies hosted by Mac himself, such as The Pied Piper of Hamelin and Mr. Bug Goes to Town.
