= Cappelli & Company =

US television program

- Created by: Frank Cappelli
- Presented by: Frank Cappelli
- Opening theme: "I'm Smiling, You're Smiling"
- Ending theme: "You and Me"
- Country of origin: United States
- Original language: English
- No. of seasons: 4
- No. of episodes: 66

Production
- Running time: 30 minutes
- Production company: WTAE-TV

Original release
- Network: WTAE-TV
- Release: May 27, 1989 – September 5, 1992

Cappelli & Company is an American children's television series created by, and starring, children's songwriter/composer Frank Cappelli. The series was in production for four seasons, from 1989 to 1992, originating from Pittsburgh ABC affiliate WTAE-TV.

Upon the program's instant success both critically and ratings-wise in Pittsburgh, Cappelli & Company was distributed by WTAE's parent owner Hearst Television to air on all its sister stations across the country. Other Hearst-owned stations which aired the show well into the 1990s included WCVB in Boston, WDTN in Dayton, KMBC in Kansas City, WISN in Milwaukee, and WBAL in Baltimore.

== Synopsis ==
Cappelli & Company featured musical segments, puppets, montages, in studio sing-alongs with an audience of kids, and a variety of human interest pieces. Cappelli would usually play a role in most musical segments, which were taped in locations away from the show's main set. These segments featured original songs by Cappelli, ranging from the lighthearted "Brusha-Brusha Brush Your Teeth" to the more sentimental "Lindsay's Bakery". Various children would appear in necessary roles to help illustrate the actions/stories of each song. Depending on the segment, an influx of other adult actors would appear. The main studio segments would have Cappelli leading sing-alongs with the young audience, while playing his acoustic guitar. Guests of versatile talents would also join Cappelli and the kids in studio. Each episode would feature one human interest segment, such as a look inside a candy manufacturing company to see how its products are made (à la the "Picture Picture" segment of Mister Rogers' Neighborhood).

Cappelli & Company's furthered success on the Hearst family of stations led to cable kids' giant Nickelodeon picking up reruns of the show for its Monday-Friday morning Nick Jr. lineup. Its airtime on Nick began on April 5, 1993 and ended on June 10, 1994. While all Hearst stations continued to run Cappelli & Company after it went out of production in 1992 (once a week on Saturday mornings), the series' flagship station WTAE ran it the longest. In the fall of 2003, after a 14 year-run, the last 10 which had been entirely of reruns, the show was removed from WTAE's Saturday morning schedule. Most Hearst stations had only run the program until the late 1990s, while later stations acquired by the merger with Argyle Television never carried it at all.

While enjoying a great run on broadcast and cable television, Cappelli & Company won two Emmys for quality children's programming and two national Gabriel Awards for children's television. Cappelli also was signed by A&M Records as one of their national recording artists and released six audio cassettes and two video cassettes, partially based on this series. Both the audios and videos have been honored with numerous Parent Choice Awards.

== Episodes ==
=== Season 1 (1989–90) ===
No.	Title	Original release date
1	"Magician"	May 27, 1989
2	"Fireman"	June 3, 1989
3	"Sign Language"	June 10, 1989
4	"Negri"	June 17, 1989
5	"Ballet"	1989
6	"Scientist"	1989
7	"Tap Dancer"	1989
8	"Police Officer"	1989
9	"Puppeteers"	1989
10	"Dentist"	1989
11	"Percussionist"	1989
12	"Birdman"	1989
13	"Storyteller"	1989
14	"Miss Manners"	1989
15	"Blind Person"	1989
16	"Gymnasts"	1989
17	"Scientist #2"	1989
18	"Umpire"	1989
19	"Pediatrician"	1989
20	"Veterinarian"	1989
21	"David Parks"	1989
22	"African Dancers"	1989
23	"Marble Champs"	1989
24	"Dietician"	1990
25	"Artist"	1990
26	"String Quartet"	January 27, 1990

=== Season 2 (1990) ===
No.	Title	Original release date
27	"Bike Safety"	May 12, 1990
28	"Spanish"	May 19, 1990
29	"Recycling"	May 26, 1990
30	"Stuffee"	June 2, 1990
31	"Camping"	June 9, 1990
32	"Jack Hanna A"	June 16, 1990
33	"Liquid Air"	June 23, 1990
34	"Bagpiper"	July 7, 1990
35	"Improv"	July 14, 1990
36	"Storyteller"	July 21, 1990
37	"Seatbelt Safety"	July 28, 1990
38	"Jack Hanna B"	August 4, 1990
39	"Exercise"	August 11, 1990
40	"Happy Together"	1990
Pilot episode, produced in 1988.

=== Season 3 (1991) ===
No.	Title	Original release date
41	"Modern Dance"	January 19, 1991
42	"Art Appreciation"	January 26, 1991
43	"Steel Drums"	March 30, 1991
44	"Aqua Zoo"	February 2, 1991
45	"Lasers"	February 9, 1991
46	"Voice Coach"	February 16, 1991
47	"Japanese"	April 27, 1991
48	"Cartoonist"	February 23, 1991
49	"Carbon Dioxide"	March 2, 1991
50	"Basketball"	March 9, 1991
51	"Cowboy"	May 11, 1991
52	"Hand Puppet"	March 16, 1991
53	"Cellist"	March 23, 1991

=== Season 4 (1991–92) ===
No.	Title	Original release date
54	"Insects"	1992
55	"Casey at the Bat"	August 8, 1992
56	"Reptiles"	April 18, 1992
57	"India"	1991
58	"Condensation"	May 16, 1992
59	"Woodwinds"	April 25, 1992
60	"Astronaut"	May 9, 1992
61	"Puppet Design"	August 15, 1992
62	"Fred Newman"	August 22, 1992
63	"Native American"	January 25, 1992
64	"Dinosaurs"	May 2, 1992
65	"Light Talker"	August 29, 1992
66	"Endangered Species"	September 5, 1992

== See also ==
- List of local children's television series
