= Captain Chesapeake =

American children's television show

Captain Chesapeake was a morning and afternoon children's show on WBFF (channel 45) in Baltimore, Maryland, hosted by George A. Lewis (November 24, 1926 – December 18, 2000, at Lutherville-Timonium, Maryland) who portrayed "Captain Chesapeake". The show aired from April 1971 until 1990. Lewis hosted a similar show, Captain Pitt on WPTT (channel 22) in Pittsburgh, Pennsylvania (which is now WPNT and is owned and operated by Sinclair Broadcast Group, Inc., the same group that owns and operates Baltimore's WBFF). Lewis began his career as the children's host of the Steamboat Bill and Mr. Cartoon shows on WSAZ-TV in Huntington, West Virginia, from 1957 until 1970. Lewis also acted as "Ghost Host" on WBFF's late night horror movie show, and did news on WBFF prior to 1988.

Children in Baltimore could become "crew members" on the show.

The Captain Chesapeake show began with the poem: "A shipwrecked sailor found himself in a plight. Lost at sea he was really a sight. He swam and swam 'til he thought he'd die, when a wondrous sight appeared to his eye. A derelict boat that saved his life and put an end to his watery strife."

The theme song was the Zez Confrey tune "Stumbling", as recorded by The Three Suns. This theme was played from a 33 rpm at 45 rpm speed.

Captain Chesapeake signed off each show with an advice for his viewers, “Be somebody important, Be yourself!”

== Characters on the Captain Chesapeake show ==
- Captain Chesapeake
- Mondy (pronounced Moan-dee) the Sea Monster, a local version of the Loch Ness Monster, not to be confused with Chessie, a legendary sea monster of Chesapeake Bay. Mondy was played by longtime WBFF employee Jimmy Uhrin. During the early 1980s, Mondy was played by WBFF employee Anna Cosby. She also was the voice of Andrew Claws the Lion (Androcles and the Lion).
- Bruce the Bird
- Andrew Claws the Lion
- Little Mo'
- Missy the Mermaid
- Mandy the Mermaid

== See also ==
- Captain 20 on WDCA
- List of local children's television series
