= Bumpity =

Bumpity is an American children's television series that aired locally in the Portland, Oregon, area on the ABC affiliate KATU, from 1971 to 1985. Bumpity, a green "bump on a lawn" (though many viewers assumed he was a frog) with one pronounced tooth, along with his friend and side-kick, a red and purple striped worm (some children thought he was a snake) named Fred, hosted the show. Other friends included Digger Mole and Scotty MacThistle. Fred never said a word, but did make squeaks in what he termed "High Worm".

An employee of the station named Bob Griggs, came up with an idea to design a puppet as an answer to a call from the Federal Communications Commission (FCC) which had asked local station affiliates around the country to air family friendly and educational morning programming. Bob created the original characters with less than three dollars. The concept was approved and quickly became a hit with children and parents alike due to the program's easy, gentle nature.

Among the most frequent guests to "Bumpity Park" were librarians from the Multnomah County Library, who would bring children's books to read to viewers. Bumpity also welcomed police officers, dentists, clog dancers, and magicians.

In 2001, Crispin and Patrick Rosenkranz created a short documentary about Bumpity titled "Bumpity Returns." The video is available through their website or can be borrowed from the Multnomah County Library. The documentary includes interviews with Bob Griggs and others involved with the production of the program, and with Bumpity himself. The documentary also features clips from the show.

== See also ==
- List of local children's television series (United States)
