= Wunda Wunda =

Wunda Wunda is the name of an early children's television series that aired in Seattle, Washington between 1953 and 1972 on Seattle NBC affiliate, KING-TV, channel 5.

The program starred Ruth Prins as Wunda Wunda, who read stories and sang songs with other characters on the show. She wore a princess hat and clown-like make-up, sitting on a magical rug to do most of her show. She had a hand-held "magic mirror" she used to help tell her stories, which was basically a pane of glass she marked with a felt pen. Wunda Wunda's regular guests included "Clancy the Clock" (an animated alarm clock) and a puppet drum with a face who indicated the beginning of music time.

Near the end of each episode, she began a regular part of her show in which she would go to the window of the small house on her set and wave at all the friends she "saw" through the window.

Wunda Wunda's opening theme song went:

Wunda Wunda is my name.
oh boys and girls, I'm glad you came.
We'll have fun and we'll play games.
Won't you play with me?

At the closing of each show, the last line of her theme song would change to: "Won't you come again?"

Another version, in the mid '60s went:

Wunda Wunda is my name.
Oh boys and girls I'm glad you came.
We'll have fun as I explain
How we play our Wunda games.

Let me take you by the hand
And we'll go to Wonderland.
There we'll play with every friend
The Wunda games of "Let's Pretend".

Ruth Prins was an actor and drama teacher at the University of Washington in 1949 when KING 5 recruited her to help them develop quality children's programming. She started with a weekly televised reading class called “Telaventure Tales," and then hosted the show "Wunda Wunda," which was also the name of her most memorable character.

Prins aimed her show at young kids who were preparing for school. She was very popular with kids, parents and teachers alike because of her commitment to education.

The show was incredibly popular and was also the first local program to receive the prestigious Peabody Award. After the show, Prins remained in Seattle, earned a doctorate in Education and consulted with daycare centers.

She died in Seattle on November 6, 2021, at the age of 101.

== See also ==
- List of local children's television series (United States)
