= James Nolan Jr. =

American television personality (1918–2004)

- Born: James Walter Nolan Jr. September 25, 1918; Moscow, Idaho
- Died: March 6, 2004 (aged 85); Gig Harbor, Washington
- Other name: Uncle Jimmy
- Education: Washington State College
- Occupations: Television Host, Weatherman
- Spouse: Esther Rehberg 1940–1994
- Children: 5

James Walter Nolan Jr. (25 September 1918 – 6 March 2004), known as Uncle Jimmy, was a television personality in Yakima, Washington. During his 28-year career, Nolan held the various roles as announcer, newsman, weatherman, program director and the role he is best known for, the eponymous host of children's birthday show Uncle Jimmy's Clubhouse.

== Early life ==
Known as "Bud" by his family, Nolan was born in Moscow, Idaho, on 25 September 1918. His family moved later to Cowiche, Washington where they operated two apple orchards. Nolan graduated in 1936 from Cowiche High School, where he was active in tennis, debate and served as student body president.

== Career ==
Nolan attended Washington State College in Pullman where he received a BA in Speech in 1940. His first broadcasting job was at KUJ, an AM radio station in Walla Walla, Washington in 1940, where he met his wife-to-be, Esther Rehberg.

Nolan served in the US Army from 1942 until 1946. In 1946 he went to work at KIT radio station in Yakima.

== Uncle Jimmy's Clubhouse ==
In 1953, Nolan left KIT radio and joined local Yakima television station KIMA as program director, and later the same year, on-air talent.

Nolan hosted the half-hour live Uncle Jimmy's Clubhouse show which was broadcast on weekday afternoons from July 20, 1953, the station's second day on the air, until the late 1970s. The show featured children whose birthdays occurred on or near the date of broadcast. During each show, Nolan would interview each birthday child, play short cartoon clips and promote sponsors' products.

Nolan would later claim that more than 20,000 children appeared on Uncle Jimmy's Clubhouse during its run.

== Retirement ==
Shortly after retiring in 1981, Nolan moved to Purdy near Gig Harbor. Nolan returned to Yakima in the summer of 2003 to tape five reunion episodes of "Uncle Jimmy's Clubhouse."

Nolan lived in the Gig Harbor area until his death from pancreatic cancer in 2004.
