= James H. Allen =

American clown (1928–2015)

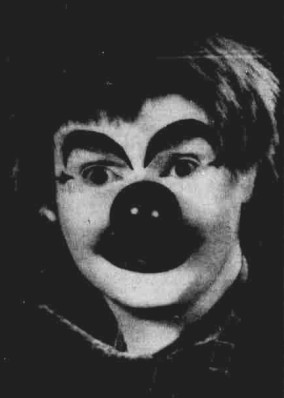
Allen as "Rusty Nails", circa 1974

James H. Allen (May 15, 1928 – July 28, 2015) was an American actor who portrayed the clown character Rusty Nails and was the host of various children's television shows in the Portland, Oregon television market from 1957–1972. His program on KPTV was the second-longest running children's program in Portland, second only to Ramblin' Rod Anders.

In 2003, The Simpsons creator Matt Groening credited Rusty Nails as the inspiration for Simpsons character Krusty the Clown.

== Early life ==
Allen grew up in North Portland, Oregon. His father was part of a traveling magic act inspired by Harry Houdini.

== Show ==
Allen, as Rusty Nails, hosted cartoon shows on KATU, KOIN, and KPTV. In 1998, he wrote an autobiographical book called Send in the Clowns.

Among Allen's guest stars was American voice actor Mel Blanc, a fellow Portlander and personal friend. On the show, Blanc would demonstrate his various voice acted characters; these included Looney Tunes characters such as Bugs Bunny, Daffy Duck, Porky Pig, Yosemite Sam, Foghorn Leghorn, and the Tasmanian Devil.

== Death and legacy ==
Allen died on July 28, 2015, of congestive heart failure at the age of 87, after a month of hospice care in Portland.

In a 2003 interview, Matt Groening credited Rusty Nails as the inspiration behind Simpsons character Krusty the Clown, a corrupt and cynical TV clown. Groening described Allen as "a very nice guy and a very sweet clown", but he found his stage name "incredibly disturbing as a child because, you know, you're supposed to avoid rusty nails."

== See also ==
- List of local children's television series (United States)
