= Bob Shreve =

American television personality

Robert Gerald Shreve (July 16, 1912 – February 20, 1990) was a first-generation television broadcasting personality based in Cincinnati, Ohio.

== Career ==
Described by Cincinnati television producer Len Goorian as "the closest thing I've ever seen to a living leprechaun," the Plymouth, Indiana-born Shreve broke into radio following a stint in the U.S. Navy as a singer on Hoosier Hop and Calling All Poets for WOWO in Fort Wayne. He subsequently appeared on "National Barn Dance" for WLS in Chicago, and Club Matinee for ABC in New York, before accepting an offer from WLW in Cincinnati. As a staff tenor for WLW, he sang the favorite hits of the day, sometimes duetting with other local talent such as Betty Clooney, the sister of Rosemary Clooney and aunt of later Hollywood star George Clooney.

In 1950, WLW added television to its service and Shreve was in the vanguard of talent to make the leap from radio to TV. In August 1950, he appeared in comedy skits on WLWT's Cincinnati at Sunset, the first local program to receive national broadcast via NBC. Thereafter, he proved himself able to provide whatever the hungry airwaves needed: an on-air announcer, a mellow singing voice, a movie host, an able vaudevillian, a soft-shoe dancer, or a cornpone comedian. It was in the latter category that he made his first significant local success in The General Store, a half-hour comedy show in the style of Lum and Abner that aired on WLWT. Set in the mythic rural burg of Broken Tooth, Measley County, USA (Population: 43), The General Store top-lined Bill Thall as store proprietor Willie, but Shreve stole every episode as his brain-dead employee Elmer Diffledorfer, who wore a sideways deerstalker cap and a necktie that stood up on its own accord. That was the same outfit that he wore portraying the "Country Cousin Alvin" on the "Old American Barn Dance" on the DuMont Television program of the 1953 summer replacement season. Remarkably, except for a basic scripted premise, each of the daily episodes was wholly improvised and the setting of the program allowed for easy accommodation of the sponsors' products. The show was a quirky comic phenomenon of its time, and Thall and Shreve made numerous personal appearances as Willie and Elmer in Cincinnati and other cities in the region, sometimes reprising the characters on WLWT's nationally broadcast country music show, Midwestern Hayride. During his tenure at WLWT, Shreve was also a frequent performer on the popular Ruth Lyons daytime show The 50/50 Club.

In 1954, after The General Store, Shreve was lured over to fledgling television station WCPO-TV, where he co-hosted an afternoon show with Wanda Lewis and Colin Male and played Lucky the Clown and Roger the Robot on the station's long-running morning children's program The Uncle Al Show. He also played "Butchie" and then "Weasel" on Bud Chase's afternoon show The Bean's Clubhouse. Circa 1959-60, he hosted The Three Stooges shorts, wearing a trademark bowler hat, plaid coat, and Elmer's old saluting necktie, and Popeye cartoons, wearing a sailor's suit. Shreve's antics made him one of WCPO's most popular and beloved personalities, especially among children, and his on-air antics sometimes caught the eye of comedians traveling through Cincinnati. He was joined on the air at various times by such surprise guests as Jerry Lewis, Doodles Weaver, and The Three Stooges themselves.

In 1963, Shreve's combined experience in vaudeville, comic improvisation, and salesmanship crystallized when he became one of the pioneers of all-night broadcasting. It was then that Shreve made his first appearance as the bartender host of WCPO's The Schoenling All Night Theater, sponsored by a local brewery, which ran from 1:30 am to 6:00 am on Saturday nights/Sunday mornings. Taking a page from Jackie Gleason's popular skits with Frank Fontaine on The Jackie Gleason Show, Shreve would greet the viewer as a visitor to his bar and prepare to pour the first of the evening's mugs of Schoenling beer by singing the show's theme song set to the tune of "Sailing, Sailing": "Schoenling, Schoenling / That is the beer for me / It has the taste of malt and hops / Of finest quality / Schoenling, Schoenling / My choice for purity / I've tried the rest, Schoenling's best / It's Schoenling beer for me!"

As the show went on, the comedy increased with Shreve lip-synching songs like Irving Taylor's When the Crabgrass Blooms Again and Leona Anderson's Limburger Lover and sometimes making surprise "cameo appearances" in the movies being shown. The show's cast of characters included Chickie, a rubber chicken that Shreve sometimes stretched past the breaking point; Garoro, an ugly severed head; Spidel, a large stuffed spider that would swing into frame to knock hats off Bob's head, and many others. During his commercial breaks, Shreve would also read on the air the names of viewers who phoned in, and it became the fashion for callers to invent preposterous names for themselves, just to get an amusing reaction from Shreve. Typically, the show mellowed to a more reflective mood around 4:00 am, with Shreve breaking into standards like "Me and My Shadow" and sometimes stepping out from behind the bar to indulge in a soft-shoe dance. The show became so popular that Shreve was invited to host an identical program (called The Schoenling Nite People Theater) live from the studios of WHIO-TV in Dayton, Ohio, on Friday nights/Saturday mornings, which lasted for several years.

In 1968-69, Shreve would follow a full night's work on the Saturday overnight show by sticking around to host WCPO's Cartoons A Go Go on Sunday mornings. Also during this period, when the popularity of the all-night show seemed at its height, he recorded an album, Good Olé [sic] Bob Doing His Thing for Cincinnati's King Records with the Dee Felice Trio backing him. The album eschewed his popular comedy routines to present a mellow, sentimental showcase for Shreve's warm Irish tenor voice and his affection for pop standards like "That Old Gang of Mine" and "Walkin' My Baby Back Home." With a cover sporting the King Records legend of "A James Brown Production," the album is now one of the most coveted Shreve (and Brown) collectibles; only two or three thousand copies were pressed.

When The Schoenling All Night Theater was unceremoniously canceled by WCPO in 1970, it was quickly picked up by WLWT, Shreve's old stomping grounds, as The Schoenling Nite People Theater. (The Dayton show of the same title was by this time discontinued.) Unfortunately, it did not last there more than a year or two. In 1975, the show moved to WKRC-TV, then Cincinnati's ABC affiliate, with the new Saturday Night Live-influenced title The Past Prime Playhouse. Schoenling beer was no longer the show's sponsor, having been replaced by new advertisers such as LaRosa's Pizza, Hemsath Sound Centers, and Mayor's Jewelers. WKRC would give the show (nicknamed "The PPP") its longest run; it stayed on the late night airwaves for a full ten years, even though Shreve's shenanigans had been toned down since the WCPO days. Among the celebrity visitors to the PPP set over the course of that decade were Adam West, Bill Cosby, comedian Pete Barbutti, and the buxom stripper Morganna (known at the time as "baseball's kissing bandit"). During the latter years of the PPP, WKRC introduced Garoro's Theater of Horrors, a spin-off show of sorts for Shreve's "gamey" severed-head sidekick, the channel's weekly horror feature, introduced at the outset by the heretofore voiceless Garoro, who had somehow gained the power of Boris Karloff-like speech.

It was widely rumored at the time that WKRC was losing sponsors for the show owing to Shreve's tendency to poke fun at and upstage his advertisers, but the truth behind the show's August 1985 cancellation had more to do with the arrival of cable television, home video, and infomercials. With more and more homes equipped to play movies on videocassette or having access to basic (networks such as TBS and USA) and even pay cable (HBO and Showtime), the "all-night movies" aspect of shows like The Past Prime Playhouse began to lose appeal to viewers. Rather than spend money to produce live all-night programming, local stations like WKRC saw more profit in low-rated timeslots, not just overnights, being occupied by advertisers instead. As the PPP disappeared, so did most station-originated all-night programming across the United States.

== Death ==
In February 1990, he died at the age of 78 at Jewish Hospital, where he was being treated for cancer, after suffering a debilitating bout with the flu. In 1992, Bob Shreve was posthumously inducted into the Greater Cincinnati Broadcast Hall of Fame.
