= The Lorenzo Show =

American children's television show

The Lorenzo Show, also called Lorenzo and Friends and Lorenzo's Cartoon Festival, was a children's television program starring Gerry Wheeler (1926-2013) that ran in several different American markets from the 1950s until the mid-1970s.

== Background and broadcast history ==
Wheeler, a native of Salado, Arkansas debuted the character of Lorenzo on KARK-TV in Little Rock, Arkansas, initially playing opposite hostess Pat Fontaine before getting his own program. He then moved on to KOTV in Tulsa, Oklahoma and in 1961 on KTVI in St. Louis, Missouri. He achieved his greatest fame, perhaps, at WJZ-TV in Baltimore, Maryland where he starred from 1962 until 1966, before moving on to KYW-TV in Philadelphia, where he stayed until the mid-1970s before retiring from television. The time in Philadelphia also saw the show being syndicated nationally, including Baltimore. While in Philadelphia, Bud Smith joined the show. Bud Smith played characters, Smythe the Magician, Pancho Villa and others. Away from Lorenzo and Friends, Smith was best known for his character, Rex Nern, the movie person.

== Synopsis ==
A typical program always began the same way: Wheeler, in his street clothes, would speak directly to the audience as he sat in front of a makeup table and put on his costume and makeup to transform himself into the show's title character, Lorenzo. The crowning touch would be a battered fedora which Wheeler would later claim to have worn on the show for 17 years.

Lorenzo, a mute character similar to Emmett Kelly or Don Sandburg's Sandy the Tramp from Bozo's Circus in Chicago, would then have his daily adventure, which usually revolved around him attempting to get a lollipop. In the rare instances when he got one, he would happily respond by dancing to Yakety Sax by Boots Randolph. (This became known as the "Lorenzo Stomp").

Through the years, Wheeler also created other characters in speaking roles—Clarence the Country Boy (with his trademark "overbite" teeth, a sunflower corsage and a straw hat); Nevada Ned, (an Old West prospector type who sported a gray, handle-bar mustache with a blue bandanna tied around his neck); and Percy the Pirate.
