= Ernie Mims =

American television broadcaster (1932–2019)

Ernest Christopher Memos (October 28, 1932 – July 14, 2019) was an American television broadcaster known by his stage name Ernie Mims. He hosted the WOC-TV children's show Cap'n Ernie's Show Boat from 1964 to 1974.

== Life and career ==
Mims grew up in Nashua, New Hampshire and served as a trumpet player in the United States Air Force Band. His first broadcasting job was at WQUB radio in Galesburg, Illinois, and he adopted his stage name there. He moved to WOC-TV and performed several on-air duties. His first cartoon show aired on Sundays, and he played Uncle Ernie, the station's janitor.

Mims took over the Show Boat hosting duties following runs by Cap'n Ken Wagner, Cap'n Verne Gielow and Cap'n Don Warren. The show featured cartoons intercut with segments on his riverboat the Dixie Belle, where Cap'n Ernie would chat with his puppet friend Sidney (voiced and animated by Craig Frogley), would give away prizes from his treasure chest, or interact with the children in the audience. The show ran until August 1974. None of the 2,600 live episodes were archived.
