= Clellan Card =

American radio personality

Clellan Card

Clellan Card (June 24, 1903–April 13, 1966) was an on-air personality at the Minnesota Television station WCCO best known for the dozen years when he played Axel Torgeson on the local children's show Axel and His Dog. Card was born in Minneapolis, Minnesota, and spent most of his life in the Twin Cities region, although he attended Rutgers College in New Brunswick, New Jersey. He dropped out of Rutgers in 1926, moved back with his parents, and worked at various jobs before starting in radio. His first broadcasting job was doing voice work for a fishing tackle commercial.

He married Marion Satterlee in 1928 and had three boys from their union, Clellan Peter, 1929, John Brooke, 1934, and Michael Satterlee, 1939.

The Axel character, a loony "Scandihoovian", was created by Card in the late 1930s on a morning radio show on WCCO AM called Almanac of the Air.

Card suffered great losses in September, 1952, and January, 1953, when the oldest two of his three children died in separate accidents. His son Peter died in an Air Force training crash in San Angelo, Texas, and John died in an automobile accident in Minneapolis. It is believed by those who knew him well that these events led Card to focus his broadcast talents toward children.

Axel and His Dog went on the air the first time on August 5, 1954. Donald Stolz, founder of the Old Log Theater, played Towser, the dog, and soon added Tallulah the cat as well. Local singer and entertainer Mary Davies played Carmen the Nurse. In October 1954, the show was the first local program in the Twin Cities to be broadcast in color, using an experimental system.

In January 1959, its rating was nearly three times that of the nearest competitor, American Bandstand. A memorable live event at Excelsior Amusement Park at Lake Minnetonka in 1958 saw an attendance of 12,000.

In the early 1960s, Card was diagnosed with lymphoma, though few people outside of WCCO knew of his condition. He continued to do the show as long as possible, but was admitted to Abbott Hospital in April 1966, and died eight days later. Carmen the Nurse went on the air the following day to inform viewers of what happened. A memorial fund was set up, with $5,600 raised in the next two months. Roughly half of the money came in small donations of coins from children.

The Pavek Museum of Broadcasting inducted Card into its hall of fame for Minnesota broadcasters in 2002.
