= Captain Satellite =

US children's TV program

Captain Satellite was an afternoon TV program on KTVU-2 in Oakland, California. Like many kids' shows of this period, it took advantage of the interest engendered by science fiction and the early space program. The Captain was played by Bob March, a local TV personality. His signature outfit was a helmet and a dark uniform under a light-colored, triangular vest that had a thunderbolt passing through a globe. The set was a cutaway rocket ship called the Starfinder II that blasted off each day. Guest children would co-pilot under Captain Satellite's supervision. As the ship orbited on auto-pilot, the children would participate in games to win prizes (found in the "Space Locker"), and in live promotions. Old Thirties cartoons like Scrappy and serials would be introduced between breaks, and occasionally there were special appearances, as when The Three Stooges came to visit the Starfinder II.

There were format changes, but the show ran for a decade. The last episode aired on April 25, 1969. In or about early 1966, “Captain Satellite” announced that the Starfinder-II was being mothballed and the series would get a new “flying saucer” style spaceship. The show had a naming contest and they settled on the name “Laser-II,” rather than the Jupiter-II from “Lost In Space” lore. (It is said that when the new spaceship was named, it was originally called Laser 7, so that the L would touch the top of the 7 creating a lightning bolt. Unfortunately, it seemed to refer to KGO Channel 7 in San Francisco rather than KTVU Channel 2, where the show originated, so it was changed to Laser II.) The latter sci-fi show on the CBS network seems to have changed the spaceship format to a flying-saucer type craft. The “Space Locker” had a new entry system – computer punch cards – instead of keys. Three of the five cards inserted into the locker would flash: “need more data” on the screen –– giving the contestant extra attempts to open up the “Space Locker.” The winning card would open the locker, while the losing card would answer: “does not compute!” (probably borrowed from the robot in the “Lost In Space” series).

After the show folded, Captain Satellite continued to make guest appearances throughout the San Francisco Bay Area at various events like sci-fi movie openings at theatres and at amusement parks.

Bob March also played cameo or bit roles in Hollywood films. One was as a reporter in the 1968 Steve McQueen movie, Bullitt. Another was as a councilman in the second Dirty Harry film, Magnum Force, starring Clint Eastwood.

March retired in 1995 and lived in Auburn, California.

March died on August 6, 2020, at his home near Sacramento, California. He was 93.
