= Captain Tugg =

Captain Tugg was the host of a local children's cartoon show that was broadcast in the early 1960s by WTTG, Channel 5, a Washington, D.C. television station. Captain Tugg was the master of the Channel Queen, a tugboat that plied the Potomac River, near the capital city. With his parrot, Fantail (a puppet), he fought spies Spike Marlin and Axel Grackle and the Sea Hag. Lee Reynolds, the actor who played Tugg, also played Commander Salamander and a number of other characters on the show. His skits and adlibbed lines were sandwiched between animated cartoons. On Christmas Eve, the captain would use his onboard radar to track Santa's progress as he made his international rounds.

== Cartoons ==
1. Popeye
2. The Adventures of Rocky and Bullwinkle and Friends
3. Space Angel
4. The Mighty Hercules
5. Clutch Cargo
