= Larry Smith Puppets =

Larry Smith Puppets (or The Larry Smith Show) was a long-running afternoon television program, seen from 1969 to 1974 on WXIX-TV in Cincinnati, Ohio, geared toward the elementary school aged crowd. It was one of many TV puppet shows created by TV personality Larry Smith and was a favorite of children in the so-called "Tri-State Area" consisting of Southwestern Ohio, Northern Kentucky, and Southeastern Indiana.

Notable Characters included:

- Snarfie R. Dog
- Hattie the Witch
- Rudy the Rooster
- Teaser the Mouse

Mr. Smith ostensibly retired in 2000, but made occasional appearances with his puppets until his death on February 19, 2018.
