= Gene London =

American television personality (1931–2020)

- Born: Eugene Norman Yulish; June 9, 1931; Cleveland, Ohio, U.S.
- Died: January 19, 2020 (aged 88); Reading, Pennsylvania, U.S.
- Occupations: Television personality; fashion designer
- Television: Cartoon Corners (also known as The Gene London Show)
- Spouse: John Thomas (m. 2016)

Eugene Norman Yulish (June 9, 1931 – January 19, 2020), known as Gene London, was an American television personality and fashion designer. He was the creator and host of a long-running, local children's television program, Cartoon Corners. Also known as The Gene London Show, the program aired on WCAU Channel 10 in Philadelphia, Pennsylvania from 1959 to 1977, and had a broadcast reach throughout a significant portion of the Midatlantic region of the United States.

As he sat in front of a large sketchbook in front of his audience of children, London would sing, "The Land of Let's Pretend," as he recited the words of, and drew scenes from, the stories of Hans Christian Andersen, the Brothers Grimm and other children's authors.

== Early life ==
London was born in Cleveland, Ohio, the son of Isadore and Minna Yulish. His parents were Russian Jewish immigrants. Initially raised in Cleveland, Ohio, Eugene Yulish and his brothers, Stanley, Morton and Charles, moved with their parents to Miami Beach, Florida, where his father, a grocer, opened one of the first supermarkets. The store became so successful that the family became millionaires.

With their father kept busy with the operation of his new store and their mother occupied with multiple charitable and social obligations, the boys saw little of their parents, but instead found enjoyment in their own pursuits. In Eugene's case, those pursuits included comedy programs and vocal mimicry, fantasy romance, Marie Antoinette, Napoleon and other historical figures, literature, including Shakespeare's Romeo and Juliet, mythology, radio programs, and the cartoons of Walt Disney. An imaginative child, London recalled, "Alone in my room when all the other kids were playing ball, I'd tell myself the story, acting out all the parts, including Snow White standing by the side of the well singing, 'I'm Wishing'."

His father's supermarket success was short-lived, however; according to an interview with London in 1974, his family "lost everything when an A&P was built close by."

As a result, he went to work as a teenager. His early career included stints as a counselor at Summerdale Day Camp, just outside Philadelphia, where he taught arts and crafts and puppetry; occasional work on NBC-TV's Hi Mom! hosted by ventriloquist Shari Lewis; a cast member on the puppet show Johnny Jupiter; as Re-ject the Robot.

At the age of seventeen, he traveled to New York City, where he hoped he would have a better chance at becoming a more successful entertainer. It was there that he changed his name to Gene London, had cosmetic surgery to fix a bump on his nose and a cracked front tooth, and became a puppeteer on Herb Sheldon's kids' TV shows on WABD-TV.

In 1957, London succeeded Henry Burbig as the second host/performer and instructor of WABC-TV's Tinker's Workshop, and portrayed the character of "Tinker Tom, the Toymaker" as a big brother type, rather than as a grandfatherly inculcator of values. London hosted the show from 1957 to mid-1958, when he was ousted from the program following a creative dispute with station management.

In 1959, he appeared semi-regularly on holiday-themed special editions of NBC-TV's Today Show with the series' first host/interviewer, Dave Garroway.

== Show history ==
Originally referred to by several titles—Gene London's Cartoons & Stuff, The Wonderful World of Gene London, and Cartoon Corners, early programs in this long-running children's educational television series began each time with London singing his show's theme song and palming the tops of the heads of the children in his live audience as he walked onto the set and greeted them at the entrance to the General store where he worked for Mr. Dibley. Dibley was portrayed as a stingy boss who only paid London three-and-a-half cents per week and was nicknamed "Old Dibble-Puss."

Flipping the sign to read "Open for Business," London invited the children into the store, which was located next to a confetti factory. Depicted as a dull place, the store was made more exciting by London, an accomplished artist and storyteller who used a large drawing pad to illustrate key scenes and characters from the tall tales he told children as they sat around him on the set. Operating with a small budget, London captured the attention of children by pretending that he had the help of a magic, Golden Fleece as he and his cast performed clever interpretations of classic novels such as She Who Must Be Obeyed and various Greek myths and taught generations of children how to use their imaginations. Cartoons created by Disney and other artists were also shown.

Initially presented in black and white, London's show began broadcasting in color during the winter of 1966.

During the early years of the show, London's character was portrayed as having a crush on Debbie Dibley, his employer's daughter, but that story line was later dropped with Debbie's departure explained by a relocation to Hollywood. London subsequently introduced a new imaginary site for the program—a haunted house known as Quigley Mansion that was located next door to the general store and accessible via a secret tunnel. In reality, Quigley Mansion was merely just a model that created an establishing shot, but this artifice was so well done that the stories and plots about ghosts, UFOs and aliens that London created for the haunted house segments became increasingly popular with his viewers. During this same period, London's show also featured a series of public service exchange programs produced by CBS in which he played a reporter trying to improve the newspaper's circulation by adding a children's beat with stories from children.

In August 1967, a troop of Brownies traveled from Girardville, Pennsylvania, to Philadelphia to participate in the taping of two of the show's episodes. Prior to the taping, London gave the girls a tour of the studio and his show's sets, and taught them about key aspects of the show's filming and production. That same summer, London appeared before a large audience in the new community auditorium of the Boscov's department store in Pottsville, Pennsylvania.

That same year, London created and starred in "A Gene London Christmas Special." Filmed in color on location at the Camelback Ski Lodge in Pennsylvania's Pocono Mountains and at Valley Forge Chapel, the program featured London's narration of "Why the Chimes Rang" and a performance of class Christmas carols by Philadelphia's Schola Cantorum of St. Francis de Sales Roman Catholic Church. The thirty-minute program aired on WCAU-TV at 5:30 p.m. on December 23, 1967.

=== Awards and other honors ===
In 1961, London's television program was honored with the Radio-TV Mirror Gold Medal for being among "the Best Children's Programs on Television." In 1962, London's television show was praised by the Philadelphia Society of Clinical Psychologists for its introduction of its "News for Children" segments. The program also won a Freedoms Foundation Award.

Recognized as a highly successful television performer by the 1970s, London taught a course at The New School for Social Research in New York City "on the genius of Walt Disney," according to newspaper reports of his career.

== Fashion designer ==
When Cartoon Corners was cancelled, London moved to New York City and became involved in the fashion industry as a dress designer. Until 2001, London operated a retro clothes shop called 'Gene London: The Fan Club' on Manhattan's West 19th Street. In later years, London served as a Hollywood and Broadway fashion consultant and spokesman for the Mikimoto brand of jewelry. As a hobby, London collected costumes worn by movie celebrities (some 60,000 gowns, dresses and fashion accessories).

In July 2002, at the age of 71, London exhibited more than 50 pieces of his Hollywood gown collection at "Gene London Presents: Hollywood Glamour" at the Showboat Casino Hotel in Atlantic City. On May 17, 2003, he once again displayed his gowns at the 80th anniversary celebration of the Old Academy Players in Philadelphia (East Falls), PA. The exhibit included a deep red dress with plunging neckline and fur-trimmed sleeves worn by Philadelphia-born actress Grace Kelly (also known as Princess Grace of Monaco) in the Oscar-winning film The Country Girl (1954).

On October 3, 2009, the Reading Public Museum (Reading, PA) opened "The Magic of Hollywood: the Gene London Costume Collection", featuring more than 100 gowns and costumes.

== Legacy ==
On November 20, 2009, London was inducted into the Broadcast Pioneers of Philadelphia's Hall of Fame.

== Personal life ==
London married his partner of 39 years, John Thomas, in 2016. The couple had homes in Reading, Pennsylvania, and Florida.

London died on January 19, 2020, in Reading, Pennsylvania, at age 88, after suffering a fall.
