= Sally Baker =

American actress

Sally Baker is a retired American children's television program personality. After a career working in television news as a weather forecaster, she hosted the live-action children's show, Hobo Kelly, which first aired in Illinois, and then on KTTV in Los Angeles in 1965, and later aired on KCOP in the same city, until 1972. Every show she would put on her huge novelty sunglasses which were supposed to allow her to see members of her audience. Parents would send in their kids' names so she could say a personal hello to them on the show, preserving the illusion that she could "see" them with her magic glasses. Even the theme song was peppy, with an Irish edge as she sang "H-O-B-O, K-E-double L-Y, Hobo Kelly, sure and begorah 'tis I!"

She was the creator of another children's live action show called The Froozles, also known as The Land of Frooze, which aired on KHJ (now known as KCAL-TV) channel 9 in Los Angeles from 1970–78. The Froozles featured a pig-tailed, tomboy character named Muffin and her puppet friends, who were made to resemble children of different ethnicities. A recurring skit on the show featured a different set of moppy-haired puppets of a simpler design telling jokes through doors in a wall à la Rowan & Martin's Laugh-In.
