= Tom Leahy (hurler) =

Irish hurler

Thomas Leahy (born 11 August 1964) is an Irish retired hurler who played for Kilkenny Championship club James Stephens. He played for the Kilkenny senior hurling team for a brief period, during which time he usually lined out as a forward.
