= Tubby and Lester =

Tubby and Lester is a children's television program broadcast on WQXI - Channel 11 (which later became WXIA) in Atlanta GA from 1968 to 1972. It aired six days a week from 7:30 to 10 AM. The show starred Charles Grenier and Richard Bingham as a comedy duo modeled on Laurel and Hardy. It was popular among children in Atlanta as a place to have a birthday party and be part of the show.

The program introduced a whole new generation of Atlanta children to vaudeville and slapstick comedy. A staple of the show were The Three Stooges shorts as well as The Little Rascals, which were in syndication. The cartoons and shorts actually aired for the bulk of the 90 minute show, with Tubby and Lester's bits bridging the gaps.
