= The Dr. Max Show =

American children's TV show

The Dr. Max Show was a children's television series which ran on WMT-TV in Cedar Rapids, Iowa, United States, from January 23, 1961 to 1981. The show focused on a traveling doctor and a clown named Mombo. Initially, the role of Mombo was meant to last for a couple of episodes, but it lasted for 20 years. The show was cancelled in 1981 mostly due to the health of the main actor.

== Production ==
The Dr. Max Show replaced a show about cowboy Marshal J. after it ran on WMT-TV for six years in the 1950s. After the actor left his role to pursue television appearances in California, WMT-TV began to search for something to replace the cowboy show. Max Hahn, who previously had community theater roles, was asked if he was interested in a role. Hahn had a history of working in broadcasting and performing in radio theater during the 1930s on the Cedar Rapids, Iowa radio stations KWCR and WMT. At the time, Hahn was a printer in a firm as part of the night shift. Hahn accepted the job proposal and also kept his printer job. Despite Hahn not liking the name of the show, The Dr. Max Show began airing on January 23, 1961. Hahn wore a safari jacket, and his character was referred to as a world traveler while making house calls as a doctor. The show had higher ratings than the competition such as Sheriff Steve on KCRG-TV and Captain Jet on KWWL. The show held a coloring contest featuring Mickey Mouse that received 25,000 submissions from four states. The show once ran for an hour and was aimed at young children while a later 90-minute broadcast was aimed at older children. Cartoons featuring Foghorn Leghorn, Deputy Dawg, Huckleberry Hound, and others were shown on the program. Dr. Max always referred to the cartoons as "colortoons".

=== Mombo ===
During the show's early years, a noise from off-stage was accidentally heard during the show, and Hahn said that the noise came from the off-screen character Mombo. He continued to blame that character for any mistakes that happened on the set. Children sent letters to the show to ask for Mombo to appear which led to Hahn's community theater friend, Fred Petrick, taking the role of Mombo. Petrick worked at the Quaker Oats Company at the time and had a history of working as a clown. He only had 30 minutes to get dressed as a clown for the show after driving from his job. He sat by Dr. Max as Mombo without speaking, but children were not happy with it and asked for Mombo to speak, which caused Hahn to tell Petrick to talk after a month. Initially, Mombo had only a few short appearances on the show until the character was part of it for the entirety of each episode. Petrick said that Hahn asked him to perform as Mombo for a couple of episodes, but he ended up performing the role for 20 years. Petrick began doing magic tricks as Mombo and appeared with Hahn thousands of times at events such as store openings and parades.

== Cancellation ==
The show ran from 1961 to 1981. The cancellation was blamed on WMT focusing more on news programs and the shorter attention span of children. After The Dr. Max Show stopped airing, a radio announcer in Muscatine, Iowa, petitioned for the show to air again. However, it was mostly due to Hahn's health that the show ended; Petrick said that Hahn "was really ready to quit" before anyone else. Hahn died in June 1984 when he was 73 years old.
