= Josie Carey =

American songwriter

- Born: Josephine Marie Vicari; August 20, 1930; Pittsburgh, Pennsylvania, U.S
- Died: May 28, 2004 (aged 73); Pittsburgh, Pennsylvania, U.S
- Citizenship: American
- Employer(s): WQED-TV, Pittsburgh
- Known for: Work with Fred Rogers
- Spouse(s): Henry Massucci, Joseph Franz
- Children: Kathy Massucci

Josephine Vicari Massucci Franz (August 20, 1930 – May 28, 2004), known by the stage name Josie Carey, was a lyricist and a host of several children's television shows.

== Biography ==
Carey was born in Pittsburgh and raised in Butler, Pennsylvania as Josephine Vicari and would later change her name at the suggestion of her television station's general manager. Carey was the host of Pittsburgh's children show, The Children's Corner on WQED from 1953 to 1961. Carey was one of the station's original employees, beginning work there in October 1953 — six months before WQED actually started broadcasting. She went door-to-door, raising money for the station selling $2 educational program guides.

Carey who was partnered up with Fred Rogers who would act as puppeteer of various puppets who would dance along to 68 songs which he wrote and for which Carey wrote the lyrics. Carey joined ASCAP in 1955 and she and Rogers produced such songs as "Goodnight God," "It's Morning," and "Why Hi, Don't I Know You?" — which was the theme song for her program. Carey once remarked on their collaboration, "He would make me very angry because I'd labor over my lyrics and he would sit at the piano and what took me four hours, he would do in four minutes." Carey wrote the lyrics to "Tomorrow," which Rogers sang at the end of each Mister Rogers' Neighborhood episode until 1972. The puppet characters included Daniel S. Tiger, Grandpère Tiger, King Friday XIII of Calendarland, his wife Queen Sara Saturday, X the owl, and Henrietta the cat.

The Children's Corner was syndicated on NBC for 39 weeks and it won a Sylvania Award in 1955 for the best locally produced children's program in the country. The Children's Corner debuted the puppet characters who would later go on to future fame on Mister Rogers' Neighborhood; characters like King Friday XIII (who would dub four children "Prince" or "Princess" during the birthday greetings segment of the Children's Corner) and Daniel Striped Tiger, who was named after WQED's first general manager, Dorothy Daniel. The program also featured a wide range of human guests, including Johnny Carson, Shirley Jones, Van Cliburn, and Charles Schulz.

After her show was cancelled, Carey went on to host other children's programming, including Josie's Storyland and Funsville, which were aired on KDKA-TV in Pittsburgh; Wheee! in South Carolina in the 1970s; and most recently, Josie's Attic during the 1990s on WQEX in Pittsburgh.

On July 23, 1999, Carey was interviewed by the Academy of Television Arts & Sciences for its archives in Pittsburgh. She as well continued to perform, act, and direct in local Pittsburgh community theater up until her death, which resulted from complications from a fall, when she was at the age of 73.

== Awards ==
- 1965—Pittsburgh Post Gazette named Josie Carey "Woman of the Year."
- 1955—Sylvania Award - best locally produced children's program in the country
- Both Duquesne University and the Pittsburgh Junior Chamber of Commerce would honor Carey with awards for her efforts in children's programming.
