= Bobsville =

Bobsville may refer to:

- Bobsville, a townland in County Meath, Republic of Ireland
- Bobsville, the fictional town in Bob the Builder
