= Ken Wagner =

American football coach (1947–2023)

Biographical details
- Born: July 10, 1947; Racine, Wisconsin, U.S.
- Died: March 9, 2023 (aged 75)

Coaching career (HC unless noted)
- 1979–1982: Reedsburg Area HS (WI)
- 1983–1984: Carthage

Head coaching record
- Overall: 6–12 (college); 62–42 (high school)

Kenneth Robert Wagner (July 10, 1947 – March 9, 2023) was an American football coach. He was the head football coach at Carthage College in Kenosha, Wisconsin, serving for two seasons, from 1983 to 1984 and compiling a record of 6–12.

== Head coaching record ==
=== College ===
Year	Team	Overall	Conference	Standing	Bowl/playoffs
Carthage Redmen (College Conference of Illinois and Wisconsin) (1983–1984)
1983	Carthage	4–5	3–5	T–6th	
1984	Carthage	2–7	2–6	T–6th	
Carthage:		6–12	5–11		
Total:		6–12			
