= Hal Fryar =

American actor (1927–2017)

- Born: Harold Boyton Fryar; June 8, 1927; Franklin, Indiana, U.S.
- Died: June 25, 2017 (aged 90); Bradenton, Florida, U.S.
- Occupations: Actor, television personality
- Spouse: Henrietta Fryar (m. 1980; died 2017)

Harold Boyton Fryar (June 8, 1927 – June 25, 2017) was an American actor and television personality. He rose to prominence as Harlow Hickenlooper, the host of The Three Stooges Show on Channel 6 in Indianapolis, Indiana.

== Career ==
Fryar graduated from Arsenal Technical High School and Indiana University Bloomington in 1950 with a bachelor's degree in speech. He began his broadcasting career as an announcer, emcee and writer as a teenager in Indianapolis, Indiana, in the mid-1940s. By the 1960s, he had developed his entertainment talents as host of programs geared to young audiences in radio and TV in Ohio.

Fryar hosted a local Indianapolis children's show on WFBM-TV that ran from 1960 to 1972 and highlighted the old Three Stooges shorts. He appeared under the name "Harlow Hickenlooper" and was one of a trio of hosts with Curley Myers and Captain Star (Jerry Vance, a.k.a. Larry Vincent). Together, they sang songs and did skits for a live studio audience of children. Fryar fell into the Stooges' slapstick comedy routines with passion. His idea of Harlow Hickenlooper's personality was for him to be a character for whom nothing ever went right, no matter how hard he tried. Hickenlooper regularly ended up with a (shaving) cream pie in his face. Fryar also hosted several other children's shows over 43 years in local television.

In 1965, Fryar was cast in the Three Stooges feature film, The Outlaws Is Coming, playing the part of Johnny Ringo. Upon the movie's release, Fryar quickly received a number of complaints from English teachers because he appeared in a movie with the grammatically incorrect title. Many younger children, who went expecting to see his trademark battered straw hat and striped coat, were unable to recognize him in his outlaw makeup. Older children and their parents were able to appreciate the comedy.

On October 2, 2008, Fryar was inducted into the Indiana Broadcast Pioneers Hall of Fame.

== Death ==
Fryar died of bladder cancer on June 25, 2017, in Bradenton, Florida, at age 90. He was survived by his wife, Henrietta, of 37 years and their four children.
