= Major Astro =

American children's television show

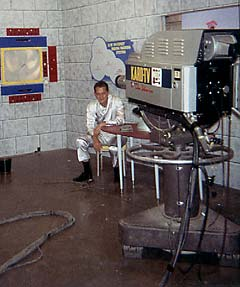
TK-41 color camera on the set of Major Astro, c. 1964.

Major Astro was a local afternoon children's television show in Wichita, Kansas, played by Tom Leahy, Jr. as "Major Astro".

It consisted of lead-ins to blocks of popular cartoons of the time, with Leahy introducing them himself in his space suit, on a set designed to look like a base station on another planet.

Major Astro started out on KARD-TV and the Kansas State Network, airing from 1962 to 1973, and later moved to KSAS-TV FOX Kansas in 1985, before ending altogether around 1989. Through the Kansas State Network, local TV stations in Great Bend, Kan., Garden City, Kan., and Oberlin, Kan.-McCook, Neb., aired the program.

In the mid-1960s Major Astro aired Astro Boy, the first anime syndicated for broadcast in the U.S. and the Adventures of Superman starring George Reeves.

Leahy ended each day's show by saying "Join me next time when everything will be a-okay, and all systems will be go. Happy orbits, boys and girls. I'll see you tomorrow". He would then put on his space suit helmet, and walk out the door of his base station, presumably to his waiting space ship, which could be seen during the program through a "window" at the rear of the base station. During the 1980s, Major Astro used a space shuttle set.

At one point in the 1980s, Major Astro's Space Patrol Kids Club had over 20,000 members.

Tom Leahy died June 18, 2010, at the age of 87.

Leahy also created the late-night horror movie host, "The HOST & Rodney" which aired in the 1960s on KAKE-TV and later on KSAS FOX Kansas in the late 1980s early 1990s.
