= Randy Atcher =

American singer-songwriter (1918–2002)

- Born: Randall Ignatius Atcher; December 7, 1918; Tip Top, Kentucky
- Died: October 9, 2002 (aged 83); Louisville, Kentucky
- Occupations: American country musician, television host, narrator

Randall Ignatius Atcher (December 7, 1918 – October 9, 2002) was an American radio and television personality.

Atcher was born in Tip Top, Kentucky. By the age of 15 he was an accomplished and favorite entertainer. Atcher played guitar, mandolin, banjo, double bass and harmonica and was often heard with his musical "Atcher Family" on WHAS AM radio in Louisville. By the 1950s, Atcher was a popular entertainer in Louisville, performing (and starring) on over 22 programs a week. Atcher died on October 9, 2002, in Louisville.

== Biography ==
Randy Atcher was the fifth child of Mary Agnes (née Ray) and George Christopher Atcher. Soon after his birth, the family farm was taken as part of the Fort Knox reservation. His family moved to North Dakota, then back to Kentucky when he was twelve. Atcher's father was a Kentucky State Champion old-time fiddler.

Atcher quickly became an accomplished and favorite entertainer. In 1934, at the age of 15, he was listed as the "Yodeling Wonder" during a concert he performed with his brother Bob Atcher at Hustonville (Kentucky) High School.

Atcher played guitar, mandolin, banjo, double bass and harmonica and was often heard with his musical "Atcher Family" on WHAS AM radio in Louisville. The family was first broadcast in 1932 on Louisville's WLAP AM radio station and then began a two and a half-year run on WHAS AM that ended in 1936.

Atcher became a prolific entertainer at WHAS Radio and TV in Louisville. In 1959, at 12:15pm each day, he hosted a show called Randy Sings Ballads. At 1:00pm, Randy and the Red River Ramblers performed an hour show. His children's show T-Bar-V Ranch aired every day at 4:00pm. On Saturdays, Atcher did the WHAS Old Kentucky Barn Dance that aired Saturdays from 6:00pm to 7:00pm and the Country Record Shop show from 7:30pm to 8:30pm. Atcher's popular barn dance show was also a featured attraction for two Saturday nights at the Kentucky State Fair.

== Early career ==
Atcher originally performed with musician members of his family. A 1935 newspaper article listed "Bob Atcher, the 'Mountain Minstrel', Randall Atcher, the 'Laughing Yodeler', Dad, the 'Kentucky Fiddling Champion' and Francis, the 'Old Grin Boy'" on April 15, 1935, at Moreland High School in Danville, Kentucky and broadcast on WHAS AM radio. Readers were told they would "laugh 'til your sides ache".

=== Interrupted college ===
Atcher attended the Western Kentucky Teachers College in 1936. The "radio yodeler from West Point" won the position of vice-president of the freshman class. The Ohio River flood of 1937 washed the Atcher family home at West Point away, and Atcher withdrew from the college, helping to rebuild the family home. He did not return to college, having decided to continue in entertainment.

=== Return to broadcasting ===
Later in 1937, Atcher joined the hillbilly radio troupe "Uncle Henry and His Kentucky Mountaineers". In 1938, he joined "Sunshine Sue and Her Rock Creek Rangers", playing guitar and singing on WHAS (AM) radio. While a member of that troupe, Atcher also played the rube comedic character "Lemuel Q. Splutterfluss". In 1939 the group moved to KMOX (AM) in St. Louis.

In 1938, he left Louisville for Chicago and put a band together there. He won slots performing on WJJD and WBBM and became a local star; he also recorded occasionally with his older brother, Bob Atcher.

In 1941, Atcher joined his brother Bob and Bob's wife Laurena Applegate, known as "Bonnie Blue Eyes" as "The Western Trio" on Ben Bernie's Just Entertainment program. The program aired on Louisville's WHAS (AM) radio station Mondays through Fridays at 4:45 pm.

== Military service ==
Atcher stepped away from WJJD (AM) in Chicago and enlisted as a private in the United States Army Air Forces, saying "We were with Ben Bernie's old orchestra on a tour at the time of Pearl Harbor. My birthday is December 7, so it's easy to remember. And I quit the troupe that night and came home and enlisted in the Air Force. When I went in the Air Force... I decided that I probably wouldn't go back into music when I got out of the service. But after four and a half years it was just so natural to go back to the entertaining that that's what I did." Atcher mustered out having earned the rank of Major in the US Army Air Forces.

== Later career ==
Upon discharge from the Army, Atcher initially returned to WHAS AM radio as a performer on their Old Kentucky Barn Dance. Atcher signed a solo recording contract with MGM Records and also recorded many songs with his brother Bob for Columbia Records.

Atcher was heard and seen multiple times per day and per week with many different radio and later television shows. Atcher also performed at many local venues, singing and playing western music. In 1949, he appeared nightly at the Silver Creek Country Club in Jeffersonville, Indiana.

=== Radio career ===
In 1946, Atcher was hired as station musical director, helping sign WFRP AM radio on the air in Savannah, Georgia. In 1947, Atcher returned to Louisville, where he and his Swinging Cowboys band were heard nightly on WHAS AM radio as well as every Sunday morning 7:15 am on a WHAS AM radio show entitled "Camp Meeting Singers.

Atcher left WHAS AM, moving in April, 1948 to WGRC AM. By December, 1948, Atcher had hired on as a booth announcer and singing talent on two music shows broadcast on Louisville's WKLO AM radio. He also worked there as a disk jockey hosting his country music themed "Randy A Show". His shift featured country music, from 8am until 12 Noon, Monday through Friday.

WHAS AM approached Atcher with a job offer. Atcher asked WKLO to pay him what they were paying another announcer, Foster Brooks. Atcher knew WKLO was paying Brooks' both a salary as well as paying his alimony. WKLO refused Atcher's request and Atcher went to WHAS AM.

In 1950 through 1951, Atcher was a performer on the WHAS AM radio program "Circle Star Ranch".

=== Television career ===
Atcher was a popular entertainer in Louisville. "At one time on WHAS, counting radio and television, we were doing 22 programs a week. I did three radio programs daily and on Friday night the Old Kentucky Barn Dance program on radio and then we did T-Bar-V Ranch five days a week and Hayloft Hoedown, so we kept busy."

=== T-Bar-V Ranch ===
Atcher appeared on WHAS TV's first television broadcast day in Louisville on March 27, 1950. During the station's first program, Atcher previewed his concept for a locally produced children's show T-Bar-V Ranch. The next Monday, Atcher started his half-hour children's program. T-Bar-V Ranch aired at 4:00pm for almost 25 years, five days a week. Atcher said "At the time it (T-Bar-V Ranch) went off the air, it was the longest-running show with the same talent in the country." It is estimated over 135,000 children had their birthdays celebrated during the show's broadcast run.

Atcher was the star of the show, and his sidekick, "Cactus" (played by Tom Brooks), brother of actor and comedian Foster Brooks), sang songs, performed skits, and gave parenting tips and advice to their children audience.

Atcher wrote the theme song for the show. The lyrics included advice that urged his young viewers to "Brush your teeth each morning / Get lots of sleep at night / Mind your mom and daddy / 'Cause they know what is right."

In 1950, Atcher formed a new band, the Red River Rangers, who performed on every T-Bar-V Ranch show. The Red River Ramblers band included George Workman on bass, Shorty Chesser on guitar, Bernie Smith on guitar and banjo, Sleepy Marlin on fiddle, and Tiny Thomale on piano. The band also performed live at local state fairs and events.

In 1953, White Castle began advertising its hamburgers through the show, the first of several companies who contracted product placement.

Speaking of T-Bar-V Ranch's reach, Atcher said "One of the things that I will always remember is in 1966 the State Department asked me to take some of our entertainers and entertain the troops in Santo Domingo and in Guantanamo Bay, Cuba. ...we were in this, I think, a soccer stadium – it was a huge stadium – and we had arranged the program so that I would go out by myself to start and then bring each one of them out after I had sung a few songs. I walked out on the stage and a voice from way back in the crowd said, 'Well, I'll be damned, T-Bar-V Ranch time.' That was a real highlight to have that happen that far away."

The show ran until June 26, 1970.

=== Hayloft Hoedown ===
Atcher starred in Hayloft Hoedown, a weekly, Friday evening country music variety show that premiered on WHAS TV in June 1951. Atcher was joined by his sidekick Tom "Cactus" Brooks and the Red River Ramblers. The show aired until January 2, 1971, after which Atcher was let go from WHAS that following March.

=== Songwriting career ===
Atcher wrote over 450 songs. Atcher also wrote the theme song for WHAS TV's T-Bar-V Ranch. When the show first went on the air its theme song was "I Love the Prairie Country," a song by the Sons of the Pioneers. It was replaced by Atcher's original theme song a few years later.

Originally, Atcher sang the traditional "Happy Birthday" song on "T-Bar-V", paying ASCAP for each singing of it. Atcher wrote his own birthday song for the program and the station did not have to pay for each performance of the new song.

Many of Atcher's songs were used on the WHAS-TV programs. Hayloft Hoedown was always closed with a gospel hymn and Atcher's song The Golden Key was the most requested of those hymns. Hayloft Hoedown also had a goodnight song at the end of the program. "The parents used to tell me that their children would begin to cry when that song started because it meant they had to go to bed," Atcher read the words to the song: The time has come to say goodnight, Goodnight, goodnight. But we'll be here next Saturday, until then, goodnight.

=== Costume ===
Atcher wore a custom "Nudie" suit, made by the famous country-western tailor, Nudie Cohn. Atcher's suit is on display in the Kentucky Historical Society's permanent exhibit.

== Community service ==
Atcher narrated over 600 non-fiction books over a 40-year period for Louisville's American Printing House for the Blind. Atcher was a favorite regular performer on the annual Louisville fund-raising telethon WHAS Crusade for Children. Louisville resident and professional wrestling figure Jim Cornette recounted his astonishment in 2018 of Atcher appearing on that year's telethon, being unaware that Atcher had been dead for many years prior, with a previously recorded performance shown instead.

== Death and burial ==
Atcher died of lung cancer on October 9, 2002, at the Hospice & Palliative Care unit at Norton Audubon Hospital in Louisville. His body was buried at Evergreen Mausoleum in Louisville, Kentucky.

== Publications ==
Atcher was the subject of a biography edited by Wade Hall and Greg Swem entitled A Song in Native Pastures: Randy Atcher's Life in Country Music. The book was produced from a series of nine recordings of Atcher's memoirs taped in 1969 through 2002 and transcribed by Hall and Swem.

== Awards ==
• 2019 Gold Circle Honoree, National Academy of Television Arts and Sciences, Ohio Valley Chapter

• 1994 Alexander Scourby Narrator of the Year, The American Federation for the Blind, New York, New York

• 1989 Musician of the Year, Louisville Federation of Musicians
