= Stephen Miller =

American political advisor (born 1985)

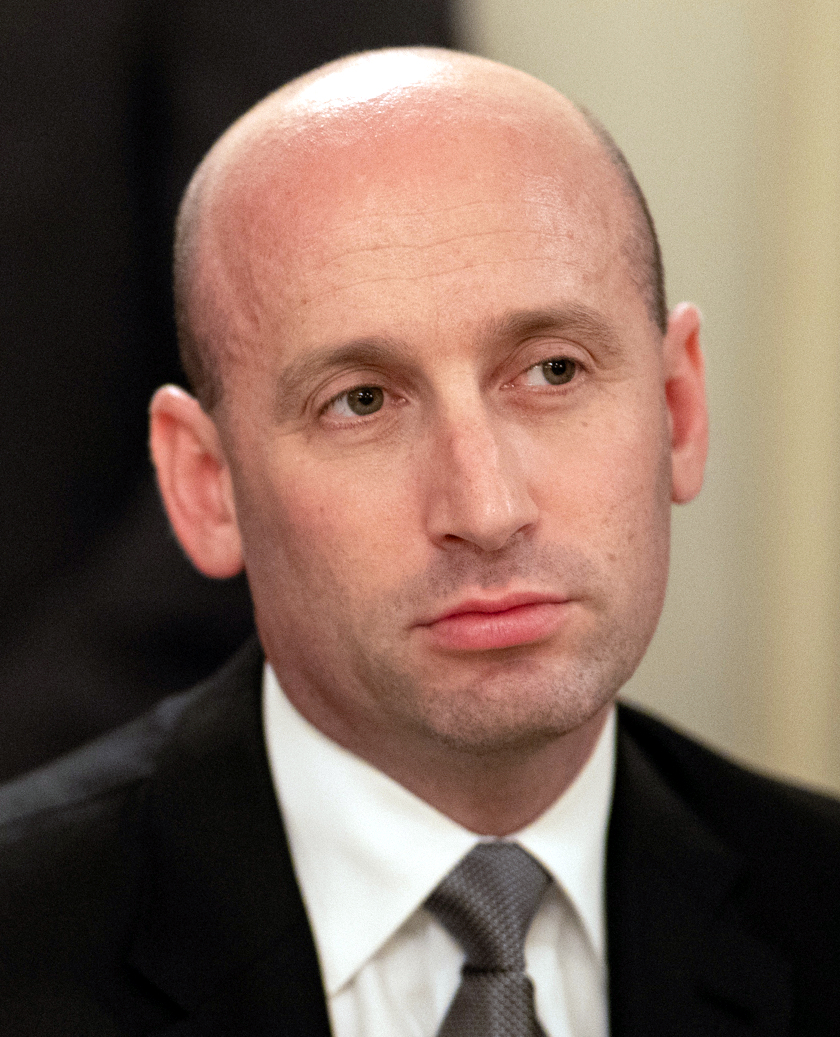
- Miller in 2025

33rd White House Chief of Staff
- Incumbent
- Assumed office November 9, 2026
- President: Donald Trump
- Deputy: Dan Scavino (principal)
- Preceded by: Susie Wiles

12th United States Homeland Security Advisor
- In office January 20, 2025 – November 9, 2026
- President: Donald Trump
- Deputy: Anthony Salisbury
- Preceded by: Elizabeth Sherwood-Randall
- Succeeded by: Anthony Salisbury

White House Deputy Chief of Staff for Policy
- In office January 20, 2025 – November 9, 2026
- President: Donald Trump
- Preceded by: Bruce Reed
- Succeeded by: Caleb Orr

White House Director of Speechwriting
- In office January 20, 2017 – January 20, 2021
- President: Donald Trump
- Preceded by: Cody Keenan
- Succeeded by: Vinay Reddy

Senior Advisor to the President
- In office January 20, 2017 – January 20, 2021
- President: Donald Trump
- Preceded by: David Axelrod; David Plouffe; Dan Pfeiffer
- Succeeded by: Mike Donilon; Cedric Richmond

Personal details
- Born: August 23, 1985 (age 41) Santa Monica, California, U.S.
- Party: Republican
- Spouse: Katie Waldman (m. 2020)
- Children: 4
- Education: Duke University (BA)
- Miller's voice Miller on media coverage of the deportation of Kilmar Abrego Garcia. Recorded May 1, 2025

Stephen N. Miller (born August 23, 1985) is an American political advisor who has served as the White House chief of staff since 2026. Miller served as the White House deputy chief of staff for policy and the United States homeland security advisor from 2025 to 2026, and as the senior advisor to the president and the White House director of speechwriting from 2017 to 2021. One of the most influential staffers in the first and second Trump administrations, Miller's views are far-right, anti-immigrant, and white nationalist.

Miller grew up in Santa Monica, California, and attended Duke University, where he was a columnist for The Chronicle and president of the Duke chapter of Students for Academic Freedom. After graduating in 2007, he worked as press secretary for US representatives Michele Bachmann and John Shadegg. In 2009, he joined the staff of US senator Jeff Sessions of Alabama, where he worked on immigration policy and helped defeat the Border Security, Economic Opportunity, and Immigration Modernization Act of 2013. As an aide to Sessions, Miller influenced the direction of Breitbart News. He advised Trump's 21st-century presidential campaigns. After Trump's loss in the 2020 election, Miller founded America First Legal, a conservative legal advocacy organization, in 2021.

Miller was a central figure in the first Trump administration's immigration policy, including the family separation policy and Executive Order 13769, which restricted travel from several Muslim-majority countries. As director of speechwriting, he supervised the writing of Trump's inaugural and State of the Union addresses. Miller is a key figure and advocate behind some of the most divisive and controversial policies of Trump's second presidency such as his aggressive immigration policy, targeting of political opponents, extrajudicial strikes on alleged drug traffickers and domestic military deployments, among others. Miller is on the Southern Poverty Law Center's list of extremists.

In November, Trump appointed Miller as the White House chief of staff, succeeding Susie Wiles.

== Early life and education (1985–2007) ==
Stephen N. Miller was born on August 23, 1985, in the affluent North of Montana neighborhood in Santa Monica, California, the second of three children of Miriam (née Glosser) and Michael Miller. (Note: Michael and Miriam had one child before Miller, Alexis, and one child after Miller, Jacob (born 1989).) Miller is of Ashkenazi Jewish descent. His family's lineage escaped Russian pogroms and the Holocaust.

Miller's mother, Miriam, was a Columbia University graduate and became a social worker. She grew up in a family of New Deal Democrats, but according to biographers, like the majority of the era's Californians, had conservative views. Miller's father, Michael, was a lawyer and worked in the Miller family real estate business. In 1998, when Miller was 13, his parents sold their home and bought a smaller home in a less affluent area.

Miller went to Hebrew school at Beth Shir Shalom, where classmates thought of him as a contrarian.

In 1999, he began attending Santa Monica High School. Miller opposed his high school's chapter of the Chicano Student Movement of Aztlán and was described by the chapter founder as having taunted immigrants; he reportedly insisted to other students and teachers that they speak English. Miller called into talk-radio's The Larry Elder Show (1993–2008; 2010–2014) and successfully brought the host to his high school. He later appeared on Elder's show after the September 11 attacks to describe an incident in which a Canadian teacher placed the flag of the United States on the floor and discussed its importance. Although other students remembered otherwise, Miller alleged that the teacher had dragged the flag across the floor and trampled over it. By his count, Miller appeared on the Elder show 69 times and their relationship continued for years.

He was confirmed at the Santa Monica Synagogue, a Reform temple. At Santa Monica, Miller garnered attention and was lampooned in an April Fools' Day issue of the school newspaper, The Samohi. In 2002, he ran for student announcer, giving a speech in which he questioned being told to pick up trash when the school hired custodians. The student body disapproved of Miller's comments and he lost the election. Miller was involved in the school's band program, tennis, religious studies, and political and youth groups. Jean Guerrero writes that his favorite musician was Elvis Presley and favorite film was Martin Scorsese's Casino (1995). Guerrero writes that at times he copied the look of Robert De Niro portraying a mobster, and that he dressed up like the movies for trips to Las Vegas, where he was a skilled craps player. During high school and continuing into university, Miller often wore a suit. He told Elder that he liked to make a good first impression. As an adult, he continued to wear expensive, American-made, bespoke suits.

Conservative writer David Horowitz heard Miller on The Larry Elder Show. Horowitz became another long-term relationship for Miller who invited him to speak at his high school. Horowitz reciprocated, inviting Miller to his home. Miller made several demands in an article on Horowitz's website, FrontPage Magazine. He asked for the school's culture to embrace "inclusive patriotism", in contrast to multiculturalism and that his school institute the Pledge of Allegiance five days a week. The school instituted the pledge, which Miller reported as a "huge victory". He wrote that Santa Monica's principal and its district superintendent blamed Miller for having caused a tax increase initiative to fail. According to Miller's article, the principal distributed a memorandum to teachers, ordering them to discuss the Iraq War in a neutral and balanced manner. In Guerrero's estimation, by his graduation in 2003, Miller had received more publicity than "probably any other student in class".

=== University (2003–2007) ===
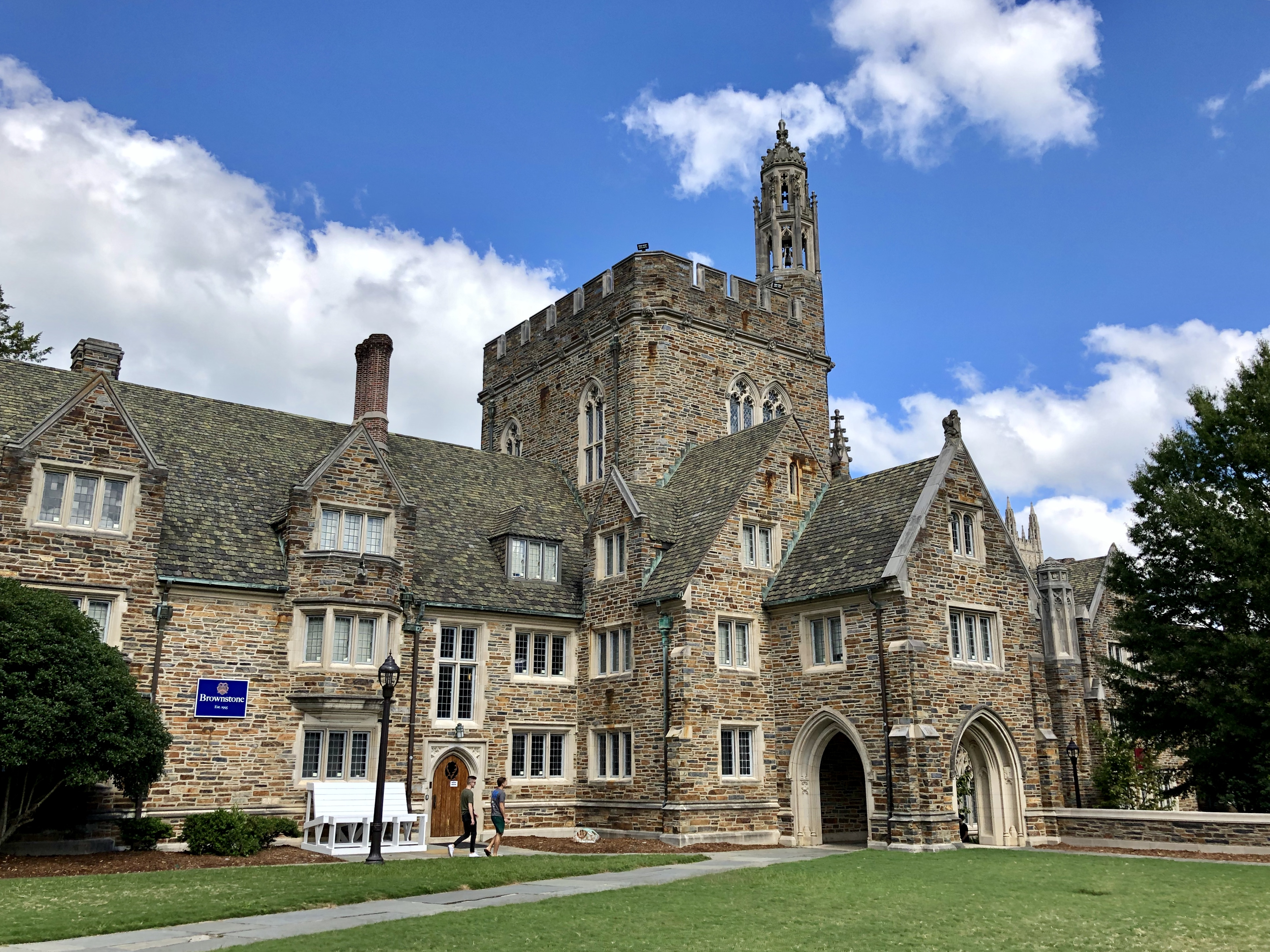
Duke University, where Miller studied (pictured in 2019)

Miller began attending Duke University in 2003 to study political science. In 2004, outraged at Duke's decision to schedule a Palestine Solidarity Movement conference, Miller founded the university's chapter of Horowitz's Students for Academic Freedom and rallied students to oppose the conference. The following year, he was the author of a column in The Duke Chronicle, Duke's student newspaper, titled "Miller Time." Miller continued to critique multiculturalism. His combative debate strategy, particularly in his column, earned Miller a reputation for pugnacity. Miller invited Horowitz to speak at Duke, who in turn named Miller to lead the Terrorism Awareness Project, an initiative that conflated Muslims and Arabs with terrorists. Miller appeared on Fox & Friends (1998–present) to promote the effort.

In the aftermath of the Duke lacrosse rape hoax, Miller defended the three members of the Duke Blue Devils men's lacrosse team who were accused of rape, arguing that they had been presumed guilty for being white males. He appeared on Nancy Grace (2005–2016) to further advocate for the lacrosse players. After reports emerged that the accuser, Crystal Mangum, had concealed the results of a negative DNA test, Miller continued to discuss the issue, condemning an advertisement that noted the persistent fear of students "who know themselves to be objects of racism and sexism" in an interview with Bill O'Reilly on The O'Reilly Factor (1996–2017). Miller later told McKay Coppins of The Atlantic that his support of the players was his greatest college achievement.

By junior year, Miller had joined the Duke Conservative Union. He had become the organization's executive director by the beginning of his senior year, a position that allowed him to fundraise. Through the union, Miller met Richard B. Spencer, who later became known as a white supremacist. (Note: Miller has denied any close relationship with Spencer, telling the Washington Post: "I condemn him. I condemn his views. I have no relationship with him.") The two organized an immigration debate in March 2007.

Although he told Nancy Grace he wanted to be a prosecutor and that Horowitz knew that he would like to be a senator, Miller skipped his scheduled LSAT that was required for law school admission applications. Later, Miller said he was focused on establishing a memorial for the September 11 attacks.

== Early career ==
=== Congressional work and Breitbart influence (2007–2016) ===
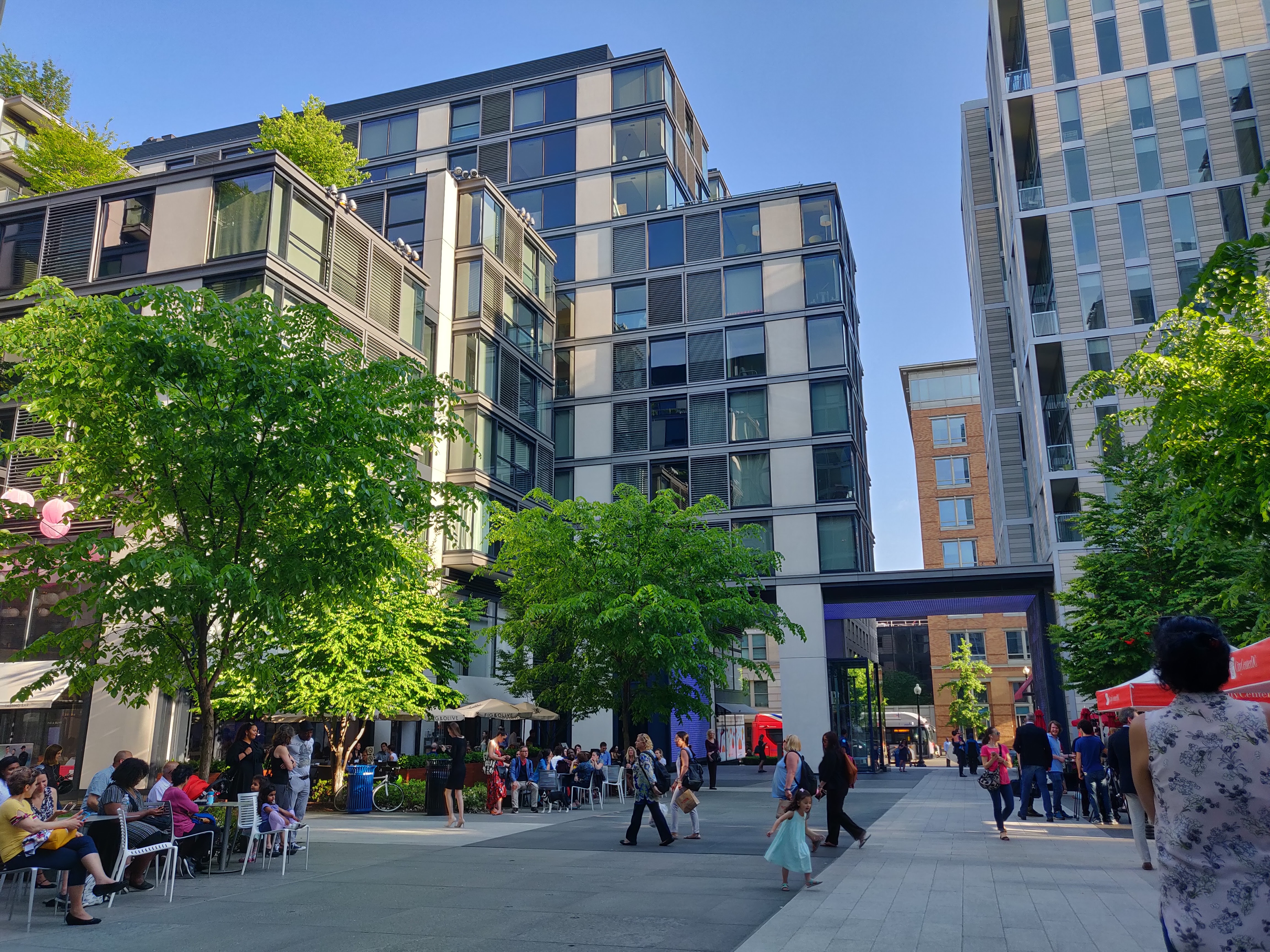
CityCenterDC, where Miller lived

After graduating from Duke University, Miller traveled across Eurasia, including embarking on a Birthright Israel trip. Through David Horowitz, Miller began working for Minnesota representative Michele Bachmann by December 2007 as her press secretary. He moved to Washington, D.C., where his family had assisted him in purchasing a US$450,000 condominium. By 2009, Miller—and Horowitz—had become disillusioned with Bachmann. Horowitz referred Miller to Arizona representative John Shadegg. Miller participated in Tea Party protests against Barack Obama with Shadegg. Horowitz recommended him again and in June 2009, Miller began working for Alabama senator Jeff Sessions as his press secretary. Miller sought to legitimize his criticisms of immigration and garner a larger audience; he formed relationships with anti-immigration organizations, including the Center for Immigration Studies, the Federation for American Immigration Reform, and NumbersUSA. Miller became Sessions's communications manager by August 2014. He met Steve Bannon and Andrew Breitbart—both men recognized Miller from his rebukes of his high school—and Bannon became an enduring ally. That year, his parents helped him purchase a US$1 million condominium in CityCenterDC.

As a communications aide to Sessions, Miller worked to influence the editorial coverage of Breitbart News. He sent editors links to the far-right website VDARE and the white-supremacist online-only magazine American Renaissance; Miller's efforts legitimized Breitbart's language in Congress and influenced The Daily Caller's immigration coverage. Miller, joined by Sessions, mounted a successful campaign to disparage the Border Security, Economic Opportunity, and Immigration Modernization Act, an immigration reform bill proposed by four Democratic senators and four Republican senators known as the Gang of Eight. The bill passed in the Democratic-controlled Senate, but was not considered in the Republican-controlled House of Representatives after Miller brought House staffers a binder with talking points and research he had conducted. Miller assisted Dave Brat in mounting a primary challenge to defeat Virginia representative Eric Cantor, who was serving as House majority leader at the time. In January 2015, Miller and Sessions authored Immigration Handbook for the New Republican Majority, a rebuttal to the Republican Party's post-mortem after Mitt Romney's loss in the 2012 presidential election.

In November 2019, Katie McHugh, formerly editor at Breitbart, published a summary of approximately nine hundred emails from Miller that were sent to Breitbart News from March 2015 to June 2016. Correspondences between Miller and McHugh show a shared concern that Mexican survivors of Hurricane Patricia could be granted temporary protected status—an exchange in which Miller included a link to VDARE, and that e-commerce websites had removed Confederate merchandise in the aftermath of the Charleston church shooting—an article that appeared later on Breitbart. Miller urged Breitbart editors to read The Camp of the Saints (1973), a novel that depicts the destruction of Western civilization through mass immigration; Julia Hahn reviewed the book for Breitbart. Kurt Bardella, a former spokesman for Breitbart, described Miller as "almost a de facto assignment editor". The Southern Poverty Law Center later obtained additional emails in which Miller linked an article from a think tank about an apparent increase in the number of newborns named "Mohammed", a story that appeared on Breitbart the following day, and an email in which Miller praised the work of the anti-immigration commentator Jason Richwine. Miller sought to disparage Florida senator Marco Rubio.

=== Trump campaign and transition (2016–2017) ===
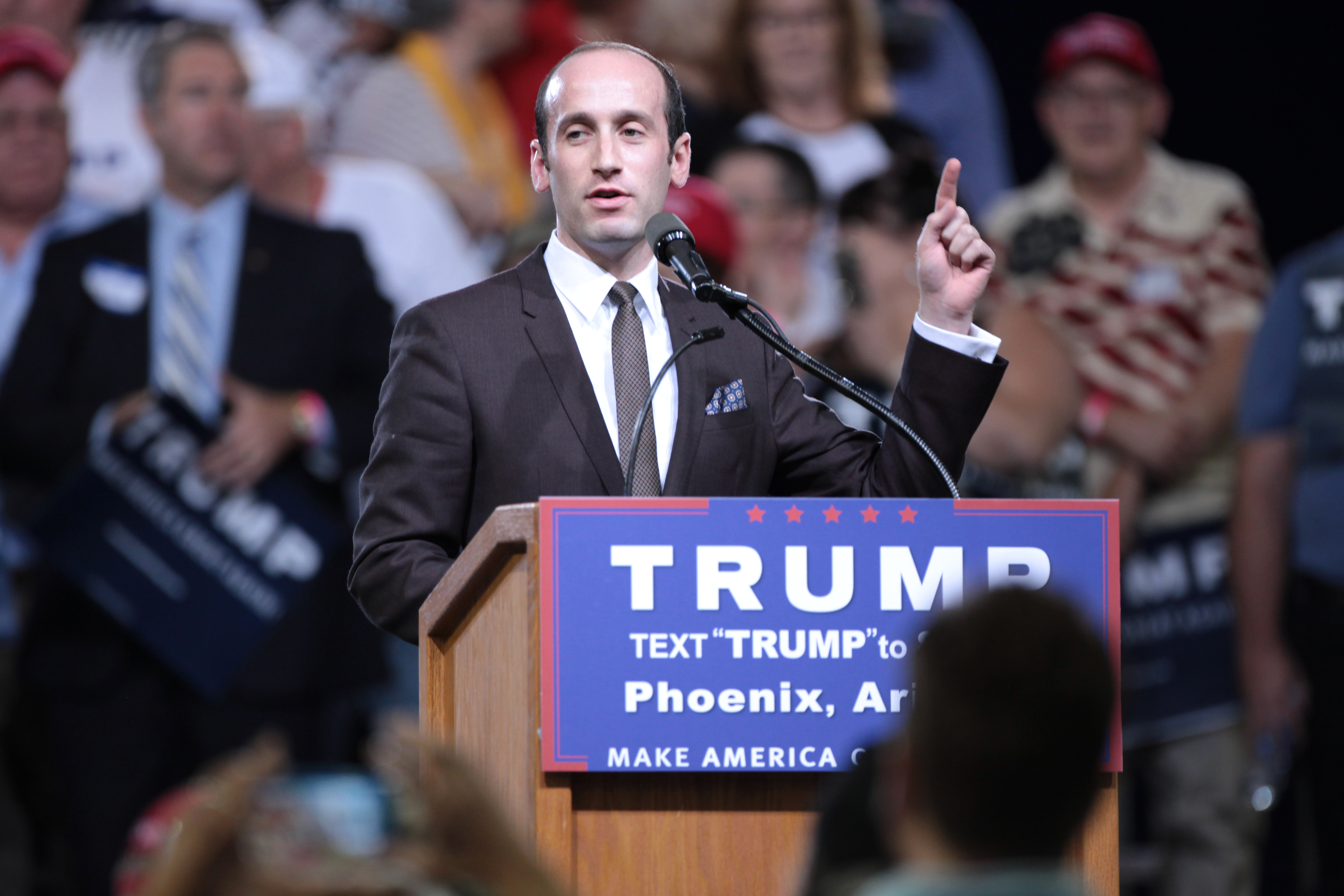
Miller at a rally for Donald Trump in Phoenix, Arizona, in June 2016

In June 2015, businessman Donald Trump declared his candidacy in the 2016 presidential election. Trump's views on race interested Miller; in an interview with Julie Hirschfeld Davis and Michael D. Shear for Border Wars (2019), Miller felt that Trump "doubled down, breaking that apology-retreat cycle" and giving confidence to a customarily dissatisfied populace. Miller was particularly invested in defeating Rubio, the son of Cuban immigrants and a member of the Gang of Eight who was running for president. Breitbart News's Matthew Boyle referred Miller to Sam Nunberg, a political consultant working for the Trump campaign. Despite a recommendation from Sessions, Corey Lewandowski, Trump's campaign manager, was reluctant to hire Miller. Nonetheless, Miller contributed to the campaign without its support. He prepared Trump's immigration policies.

In January 2016, Miller joined Trump's presidential campaign as a senior policy advisor. He began writing speeches for Trump at Steve Bannon's behest and with encouragement from Trump's son-in-law, Jared Kushner. Miller intensified Trump's language, often embedding the term "radical Islam" into his speeches. In February, Sessions became the first senator to endorse Trump, damaging the rival campaign of Texas senator Ted Cruz. Miller's interview with the Breitbart News Daily (2015–present) host Brandon Darby the following month influenced the National Border Patrol Council's decision to endorse Trump.

By March, Miller was opening act for Trump at rallies. He wrote Trump's acceptance speech at the 2016 Republican National Convention and served as the campaign's policy liaison to the convention. Miller assisted Trump in preparing for debates with Hillary Clinton. After the convention, the campaign switched to a teleprompter and elevated Miller to Trump's principal speechwriter. By August, he had become Trump's national policy director. That month, Miller was appointed to lead an economic team. Politico described Miller as an "instrumental advisor for Trump on the issue" of immigration. Bannon later convinced Trump to not deviate from speeches written by him and Miller. After Trump won the 2016 election, Miller retained his role as national policy director for the transition. He led much of the policy work to prepare for Trump's first one hundred days. Trump chose Miller to write his inaugural address.

== Senior advisor and White House director of speechwriting (2017–2021) ==
=== Appointment and initial advisorship ===
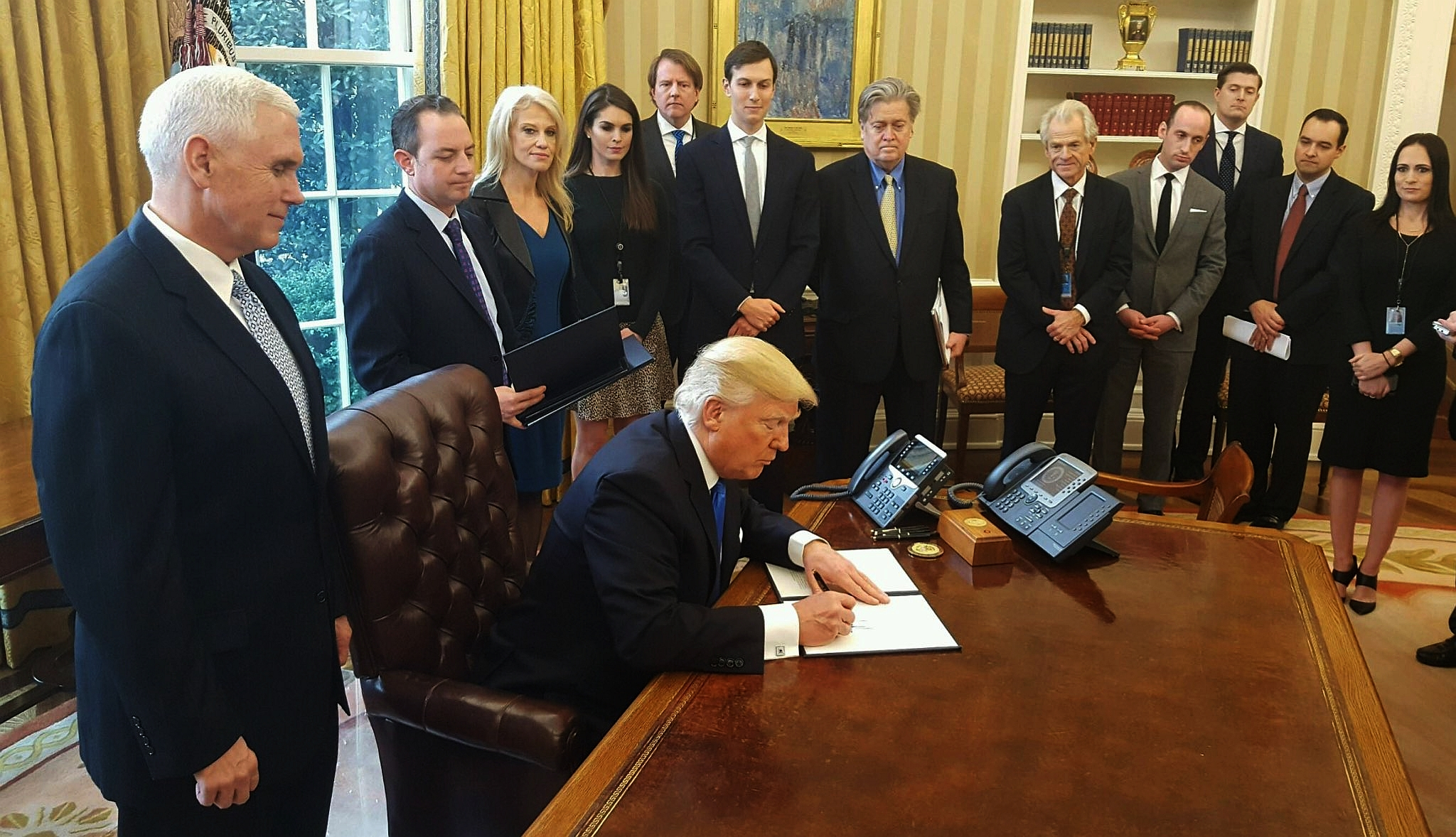
Miller (gray suit) observing Trump sign an executive order in January 2017

In December 2016, Trump named Miller as his senior advisor to the president for policy. His role was later clarified to have oversight over the Domestic Policy Council. Miller is an unelected advisor and his positions do not require Senate confirmation. Bannon and Miller co-wrote many of Trump's initial executive orders, including Executive Order 13769. The Trump White House had two ideological factions: the Washington wing centered on chief of staff Reince Priebus and press secretary Sean Spicer, and the Breitbart wing around Miller and Bannon. According to Politico, allies of Priebus were "wary" of Miller, among other aides critical of moderating Trump's politics. Miller led a principals committee meeting on immigration in January 2017, according to the Los Angeles Times. Miller's dominant position in developing Trump's immigration policy garnered him criticism.

In February 2017, The New York Times reported that Trump had urged Priebus to implement conventional protocols, including limiting Bannon and Miller's unfettered access, after reports that other Trump officials were not briefed about the travel ban order until it had already been signed. Miller wrote Trump's speech to a joint session of Congress that month. He sought to purge the federal government of Barack Obama's political appointees. The dynamics of Miller's influence in the Trump administration shifted by April as Bannon entered into conflict with Jared Kushner; Miller informed colleagues that he was not affiliated with Bannon. That month, he began to work with Office of American Innovation, led by Kushner, and began focusing on energy and regulatory issues. Miller remained an ally of Bannon.

Miller supported the dismissal of James Comey, the director of the Federal Bureau of Investigation, and drafted the letter firing him. He and Bannon were allegedly responsible for removing a line in Trump's speech before the 2017 Brussels NATO summit mentioning Article 5 of the North Atlantic Treaty, leading to a dispute with H. R. McMaster, the national security advisor. In June, Politico reported that secretary of state Rex Tillerson had sparred with Miller over immigration after Miller told Tillerson that the Department of State should be tougher on immigration. Prior to assuming the position of chief of staff, John F. Kelly worked to develop a relationship with Miller. In August, Miller publicly sparred with CNN's Jim Acosta—whom he accused of "cosmopolitan bias"—in a press briefing for the RAISE Act. Days later, Reuters reported that Miller was a contender for White House communications director, succeeding Anthony Scaramucci.

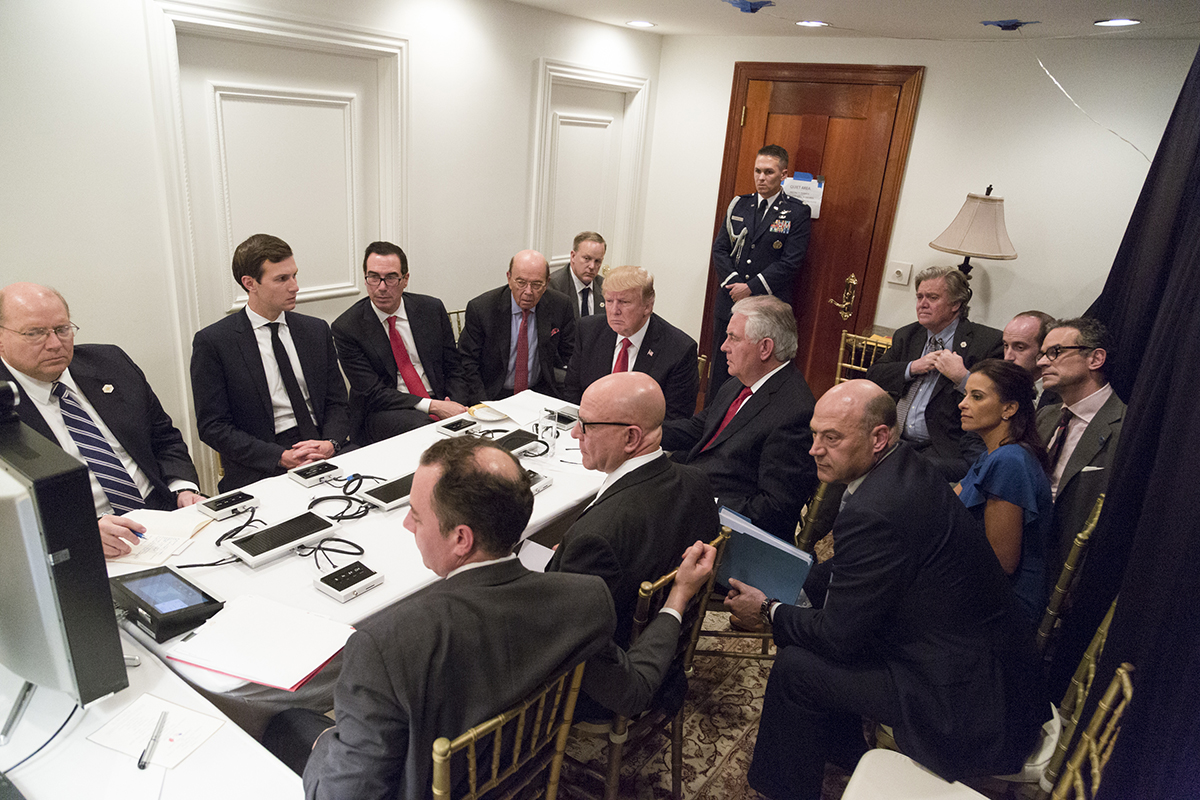
Miller (second from right) during the April 2017 Syrian missile strike operation

In Kelly's White House Office, Miller was largely successful in influencing Trump. Previously when Kelly was the secretary of homeland security, Miller unsuccessfully supported appointment of the presidents of employee unions with no supervisory experience to agency heads (of U.S. Immigration and Customs Enforcement and U.S. Customs and Border Protection). Consequently, Miller and his allies blocked Kelly in naming Alan Metzler as his chief of staff, who instead offered the position to Kirstjen Nielsen. Elaine Duke succeeded Kelly as the acting secretary of homeland security. Miller opposed appointing Duke to the position permanently. He advocated for pardoning Joe Arpaio, the sheriff of Maricopa County who was convicted of contempt of court, securing his release from prison.

In September, Trump announced a gradual end to Deferred Action for Childhood Arrivals (DACA), a program that Miller had encouraged Trump to end. The New York Times reported that Miller had been advocating for adjusting the refugee quota established in the Refugee Act from 110,000—set by Obama before he left office—to 15,000. Though Trump later stated he would work with Democrats on a deal to restore DACA and he planned to set the quota at 45,000 refugees, Miller's efforts had an impact on immigration policy. He outlined several hard-line immigration proposals, including hiring ten thousand immigration enforcement agents, in a draft that month, after Trump had reached a tentative agreement with Senate minority leader Chuck Schumer and House minority leader Nancy Pelosi on DACA.

In January 2018, as a federal government shutdown neared over disputes involving DACA, Trump privately stated that he was willing to negotiate to extend legal status to immigrants brought to the United States illegally as children; in response, Kelly and Miller rejected a deal unless it was attached to austere immigration restrictions. Republican negotiators accused Miller of preventing a deal from being struck. Miller wrote that year's State of the Union Address. He advocated for a veto of the Consolidated Appropriations Act, a bill that would fund that fiscal year, over funds for the Trump wall, pointing to the possibility of a Republican loss in that year's elections. Miller worked against the Department of State's Bureau of Population, Refugees and Migration. After Kelly Sadler was dismissed over comments she made about the political viability and mortality Arizona senator John McCain—who was suffering from brain cancer—Miller had Julia Hahn appointed to cover her communications work in order to advance Trump's hardline immigration messaging. Miller sought to garner support for a bill paralleling his immigration framework in June.

=== Immigration moves ===
Miller was an advocate for the Trump administration's family separation policy. In April, he was "instrumental" in Trump's decision to intensify enforcement of the policy, according to The New York Times, and was critical to Trump's endorsement. The policy incited controversy, including an internal conflict, targeted towards Miller in June. Amid the backlash, Miller continued to lead a plan to use executive authority and rule changes to institute an immigration crackdown ahead of that year's elections, believing immigration to be a key issue. He conducted meetings privately, in fear of "hostile bureaucrats" leaking policies, according to Politico. That month, the Supreme Court affirmed Executive Order 13769; chief justice John Roberts supported Miller's assertion that the president could use Section 212(f) of the Immigration and Nationality Act to "suspend the entry of all aliens or any class of aliens" through any necessary means. In an effort to quell outcry, Trump signed an executive order ending the practice of family separation.

According to the Financial Times, Miller sought to ban student visas for Chinese nationals, but his efforts were halted by Terry Branstad, the ambassador to China. In August, The New York Times reported that the Trump administration was considering a second reduction in the refugee quota. The Times noted that opponents of Miller—including Tillerson and Duke—had been ousted in favor of anti-immigrant officials, giving Miller's plan a greater chance of success. He privately urged Trump to continue on his border wall. In September, secretary of state Mike Pompeo announced that the quota would be set at 30,000. That month, the Department of Homeland Security proposed a rule denying lawful permanent residency to immigrants who have received government benefits, such as the Supplemental Nutrition Assistance Program, Temporary Assistance for Needy Families, Medicare, and Section 8. The volume of immigration actions the following month—the deployment of federal troops to the Mexico–United States border and proposed executive action on blocking the Central American migrant caravans and ending birthright citizenship—was described by a Republican close to the White House as "a dream come true" for Miller.

As a second federal government shutdown in December 2018 neared over funding the Trump wall, Miller publicly stated that the Trump administration would "do whatever is necessary" to build the border wall, including shutting down the government. In a meeting to resolve the shutdown, Kushner defended Miller as an expert on the subject of immigration, though Kushner's support for legal immigration led to a conflict with Miller. Miller's influence with Trump led to concerns from senior Republican aides that he could convince Trump that accepting a compromise would amount to humiliation. Trump worked on that year's State of the Union address with Miller, who took a more active role in speechwriting.

Miller opposed Ronald Vitiello's nomination as director of Immigration and Customs Enforcement and Nielsen's tenure as secretary of homeland security; Trump withdrew Vitiello as his nominee and Nielsen was ousted within a two-day timespan in April. The departures, including Randolph Alles as director of Secret Service, continued in the following days in a mass purge across the Department of Homeland Security, in what The New York Times described as a signal of Miller's "enduring influence". Miller leveraged the uncertainty to pursue an aggressive immigration policy, pressuring mid-level officials at federal departments and agencies to be more vigorous in halting immigration. He pushed for the purge to continue and for several immigration policies, including housing migrants in border tent cities and extending detention times, to be implemented. The purge led to concerns about Miller's authority from congressional Republicans, including Texas senator John Cornyn. According to The New York Times, Miller orchestrated the purge. Kevin McAleenan, the acting secretary of homeland security, resisted Miller's continued efforts to dismiss officials. Miller was influential in Trump's decision to name Ken Cuccinelli as the acting director of Citizenship and Immigration Services.

Miller advocated for the Department of Housing and Urban Development to force the eviction of undocumented immigrants. In June, Trump imposed tariffs on Mexico over the border crisis, a suggestion that had been offered by Miller and Peter Navarro, the director of the Office of Trade and Manufacturing Policy. The following month, Citizenship and Immigration Services issued a regulation favoring wealthier immigrants for lawful permanent residency, an initiative Miller had led. In September, Miller sought to further reduce the refugee quota. In December, he developed a plan to use information the Department of Health and Human Services (HHS) had on migrant children to target them and their families for deportation. The plan would have also embedded immigration enforcement agents in the department's Office of Refugee Resettlement. The effort was rejected by officials at the Department of Health and Human Services.

Miller led speechwriting for the 2020 State of the Union Address, though he sought to temper his influence on its tone. The COVID-19 pandemic provided opportunities for Miller to advance his immigration policies. The foundation for Miller's actions came in prior attempts to use the president's authority in relatively minor health emergencies. In April, Trump suspended family-based immigration. Miller told conservative allies in a private conference call that the halt to immigration was one step in a broader plan. Miller sought to influence HHS to delay the admission of migrant children into shelters run by HHS and to fingerprint adults in households where refugee children are released; his proposals were considered by the department's refugee office.

In May, chief of staff Mark Meadows suggested that Miller should serve as the acting director of the Domestic Policy Council after Joe Grogan's resignation, though Kushner successfully proposed Derek Lyons instead. After his wife Katie tested positive for COVID-19 that month, Miller was forced to quarantine. He continued to push for changes to immigration policy to follow up on Trump's order in April, raising the standard of proof for asylum seekers. According to secretary of defense Mark Esper, he reportedly called for as many as a quarter of a million troops to be stationed at the border with Mexico. Miller participated in debate preparation sessions against Joe Biden. In October, Miller was among those who tested positive for COVID-19 amid an outbreak of the virus at the White House. Miller remained with Trump after the January 6 Capitol attack; he wrote the speech Trump gave preceding the attack. Miller contributed to Trump's speech condemning the attack after his second impeachment. In the final days of Trump's term, Miller continued to work to implement Trump's immigration policies.

== Between Trump presidencies (2021–2025) ==
=== Investigations into Donald Trump ===
In October 2021, Trump asserted executive privilege over documents relating to Miller as the Department of Justice mounted an investigation into attempts to overturn the 2020 presidential election. The Department of Justice subpoenaed Miller in September 2022. In November, the House Select Committee to Investigate the January 6th Attack on the United States Capitol subpoenaed Miller, citing his false claims of fraud and his role in the Trump fake electors plot. Miller filed a lawsuit to block the committee from accessing his phone records in March 2022, arguing that the subpoena would invade on his parents' privacy since he was on their family plan. The following month, he privately testified before the committee over the speech Trump gave preceding the attack. Representatives pressed Miller on the use of the word "we" in potentially inciting the mob. Judge Beryl Howell compelled him to testify in March 2023, a ruling that was reaffirmed by the Court of Appeals for the District of Columbia Circuit weeks later.

=== Political activities ===
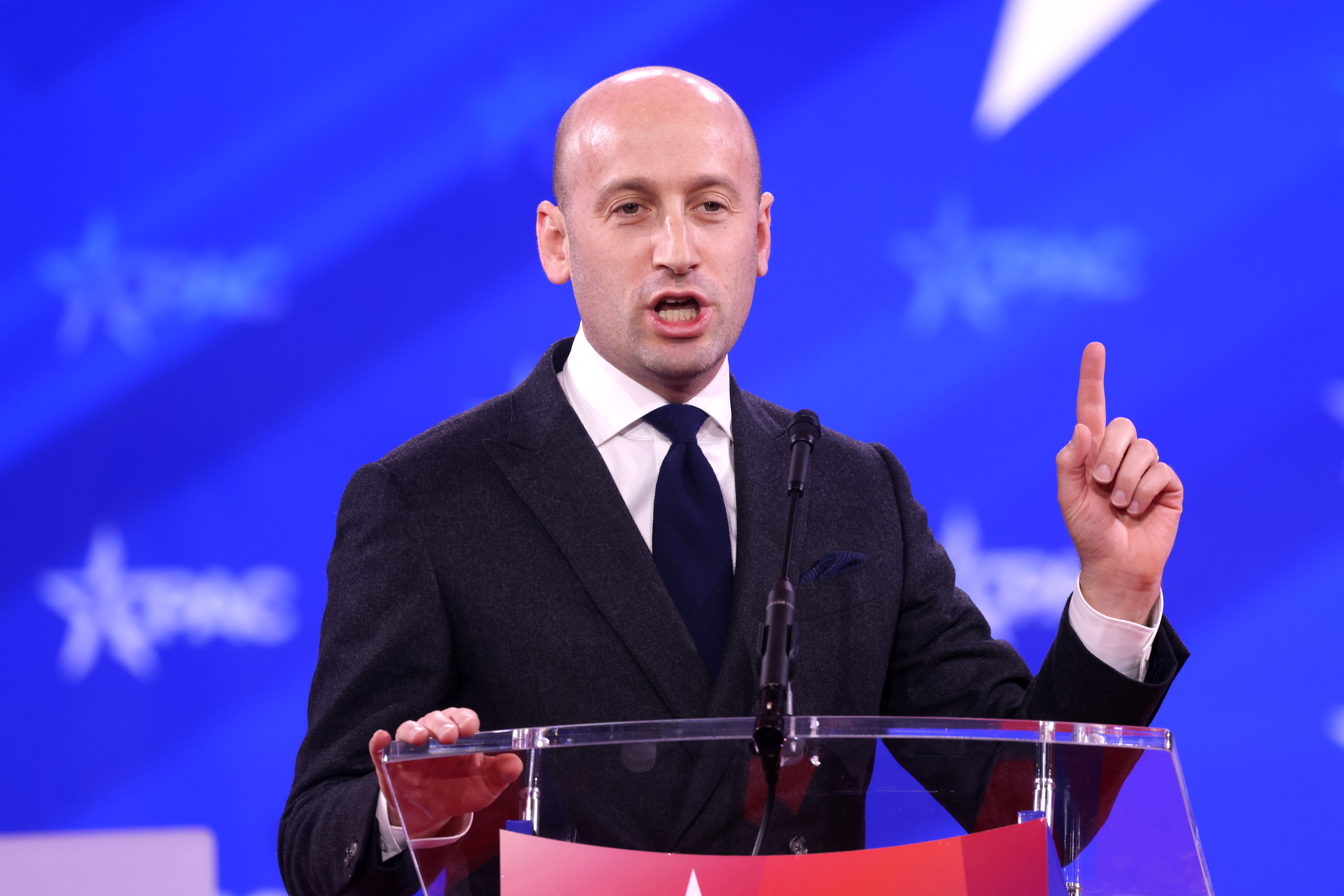
Miller speaking at the Conservative Political Action Conference in February 2025

In January 2021, after the inauguration of Joe Biden, Miller stated he was "focused on a variety of projects to advance the America First agenda." In March, Politico reported that Miller had begun forming America First Legal, a conservative public interest organization. According to Politico, Miller consulted the Conservative Partnership Institute and lawyer Ken Starr, who authored the Starr Report that led to the impeachment of Bill Clinton, and requested funding from Chicago Cubs co-owner Todd Ricketts. He announced the organization in March and established it the following month. In February, Miller briefed Republican Study Committee members. He began advising Alabama representative Mo Brooks in his campaign for the 2022 Senate election, appearing at Brooks's campaign announcement the following month.

In December, Miller began advising Bridgewater Associates chief executive Dave McCormick He was courted by speaker of the House Kevin McCarthy in his effort to garner support from the House of Representative's far-right members, particularly the Freedom Caucus. In November 2023, The New York Times reported on a Miller-led initiative to appoint several lawyers to Trump's second term including Chad Mizelle and Aaron Reitz, and his plans to expand Trump's immigration policy with raids, mass deportations, and larger detention facilities.

== White House Deputy Chief of Staff (2025–2026) ==
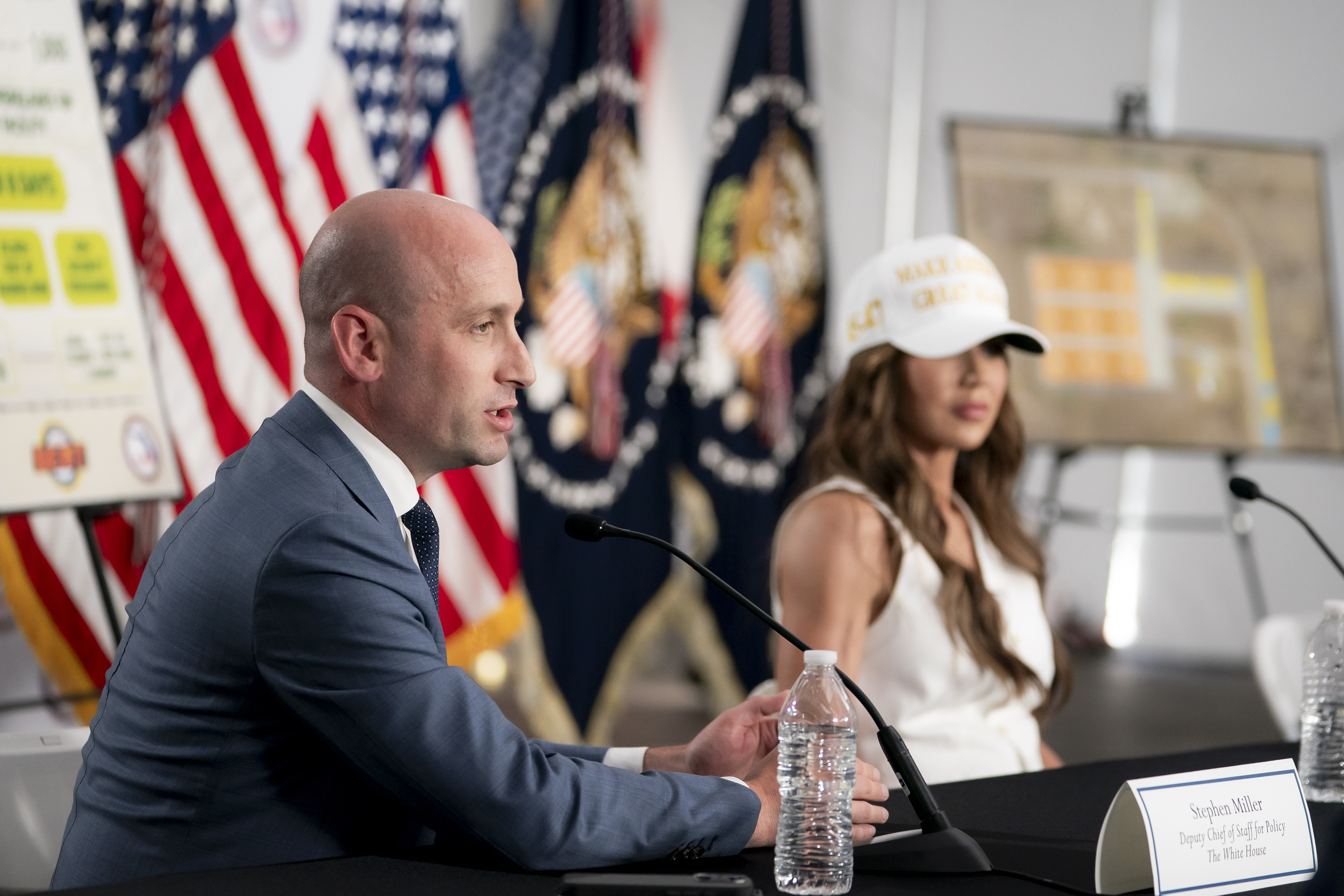
Miller discussing Alligator Alcatraz in July 2025

Following the 2024 election, CNN reported that president-elect Donald Trump was expected to name Miller as his White House deputy chief of staff for policy. Trump's choice was confirmed by vice president-elect JD Vance on X hours later. On November 13, Trump publicly announced that Miller would serve as his deputy chief of staff for policy and his homeland security advisor. Although his role was muted, Miller was expected to have significant influence over agency heads.

=== Attacks on higher education ===
According to The Atlantic, Miller "captained the administration's assault on elite universities such as Harvard and Columbia." He was central to the decision to cut $400 million in federal funding to Columbia University, leading to the university's $221 million settlement and capitulation to the Trump administration's demands. Miller has also been involved in the Trump administration's battle with Harvard, which, according to The New York Times, is an important part of the "administration's effort to break what it sees as liberalism's hold on higher education."

=== Immigration policy ===
He began educating Elon Musk on the federal bureaucracy; the two men had found a common cause in describing undocumented immigrants as a threat to Western civilization. Miller was an architect of Trump's immigration policies in his second term, and he oversaw a team writing initial executive orders. His strategy involved using existing laws, such as the Alien Enemies Act, to quickly carry out deportations and avoid time-consuming hearings. Additionally, he sought to reinstate Title 42 expulsions. Miller told advisers in Trump's presidential transition not to express concern that immigration actions could yield litigation.

=== Wider influence ===
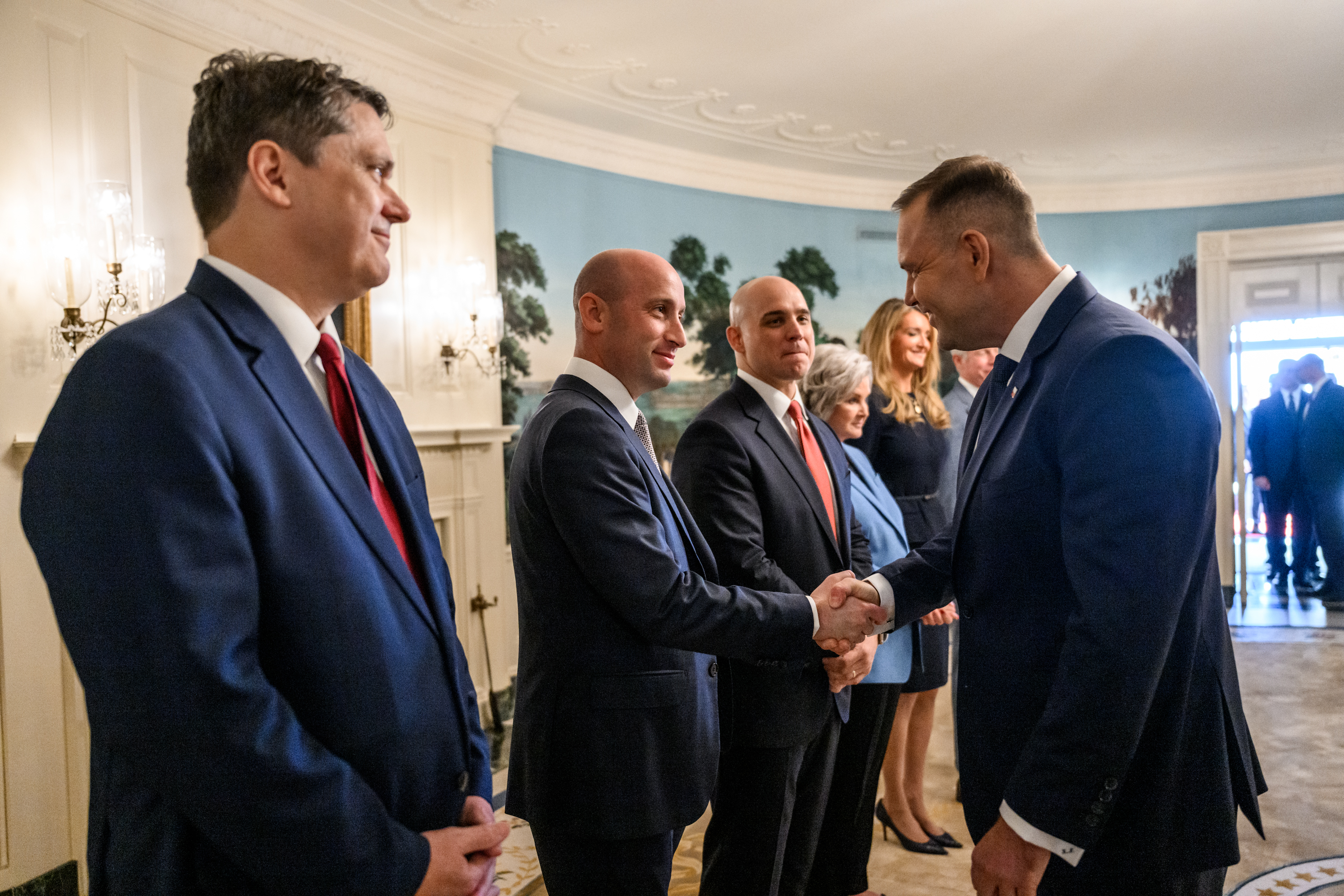
Miller meeting with Polish president Karol Nawrocki in September 2025

Trump aides said Miller's clout at the Department of Justice (DOJ) was striking—a non-lawyer could hold sway over the attorney general. Pam Bondi, Trump's nominee to serve as attorney general following Matt Gaetz's withdrawal, successfully advocated for Trump to nominate her ally Hillsborough County sheriff Chad Chronister as his administrator of the Drug Enforcement Administration. Miller was critical of Chronister, who withdrew his nomination. According to journalists Carol Leonnig and Aaron Davis in their book Injustice (2025), Miller pressured acting deputy attorney general Emil Bove to act more vigorously in dismissing officials at the Federal Bureau of Investigation, citing the bureau's nominal director, Kash Patel. Defying and contradicting DOJ court papers that asserted "administrative error", Miller told reporters in April 2025 that Kilmar Abrego Garcia, a Salvadoran national, was not mistakenly deported. The following month, he stated that the Trump administration was considering suspending habeas corpus for immigrants. In May 2025, Axios reported that Miller and secretary of homeland security Kristi Noem had set an arrest quota of three thousand people per day; DOJ later denied the existence of a quota in Noem v. Vasquez Perdomo, a court case over protests in Los Angeles in June.

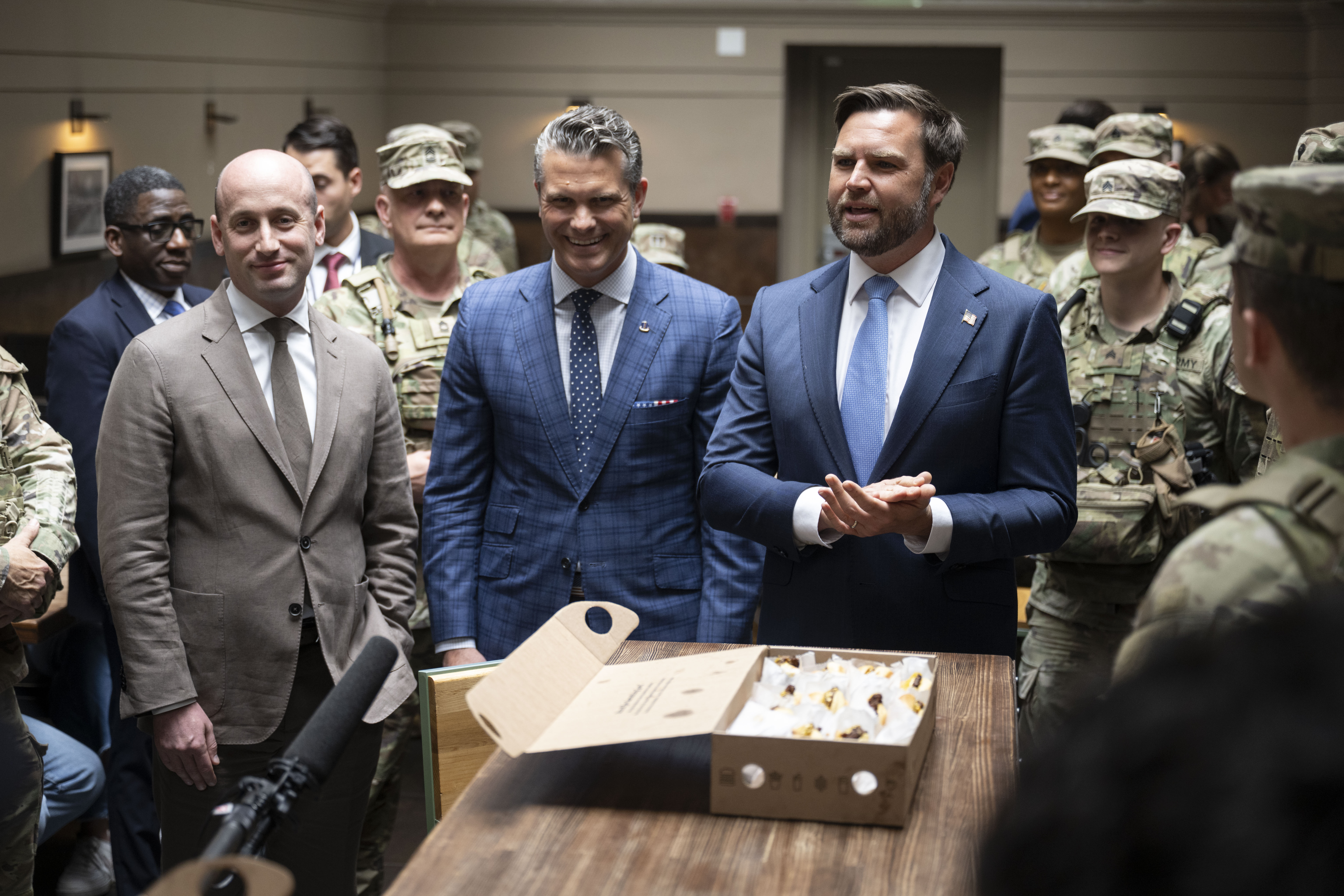
Miller, Pete Hegseth and JD Vance with National Guard troops in Washington, D.C. in August 2025

Miller led Trump's federalization of the District of Columbia National Guard. After the assassination of Charlie Kirk, he appeared on The Charlie Kirk Show—hosted by Vance—to vow that he would use the Department of Justice and the Department of Homeland Security to dismantle what he falsely alleged was a "vast domestic terror movement" responsible for Kirk's murder. As homeland security advisor, Miller separated the Homeland Security Council from the National Security Council, in a break from precedent. Miller, through the council, assumed a leading role—sometimes exceeding that of secretary of state and national security adviser Marco Rubio—in the United States's decision to strike Venezuelan boats, according to anonymous sources as reported by The Guardian and the New York Times. Miller was also tasked with ensuring that federal departments do not take actions that could damage relations with China, as reported by the Financial Times.

== White House Chief of Staff (2026–present) ==
In October 2026, Politico reported that Trump was considering firing Susie Wiles, the White House chief of staff, and appointing Miller to take her position. On November 6, Wiles announced her resignation. That day, Trump appointed Miller to succeed Wiles. According to The New York Times, Miller told Trump in a pitch for the job that he needed to end the Iran war. Miller became the White House chief of staff on November 9.

== Views ==
Miller’s views are ultraconservative, anti-immigrant, ultranationalist, and white nationalist. Miller began identifying with ideologies associated with conservatism in the seventh grade. Former high school classmates of Miller speculated to The New York Times that Miller enjoyed contrarianism and confrontations. Conservative political commentator Larry Elder told The New York Times that Miller had read Ayn Rand and The Federalist Papers in high school. According to his former dormmates at Duke University, Miller described himself as a libertarian. Miller supported Donald Trump running for president as early as 2014. In July 2020, the Southern Poverty Law Center added Miller to its database of extremists. After Barack Obama spoke at the 2020 Democratic National Convention, Miller referred to Obama as "one of the worst presidents, if not the worst president, in U.S. history."

=== Immigration ===
Stephen Miller
(@StephenM)
tweeted:

English:

Plenty of countries in history have experimented with importing a foreign labor class. The West is the first and only civilization to import a foreign labor class that is granted full political rights, including welfare & the right to vote. All visas are a bridge to citizenship.

January 31, 2026

Miller is an opponent of illegal immigration. He has argued that documented and undocumented immigrants have expanded the U.S. labor market, leading to reduced wages. In January 2017, Miller privately proposed eliminating the lottery process for H-1B visas in favor of a system that would give preference to visa petitions for high-salary jobs. His uncle, neuropsychologist David S. Glosser, wrote an article in Politico Magazine in August 2018 accusing Miller of hypocrisy for his anti-immigration stance. As a communications aide to Jeff Sessions, Miller opposed Deferred Action for Childhood Arrivals as "mass backdoor amnesty". Miller is a proponent of stricter asylum rules, telling Fox News that Afghan refugees fleeing the country after the 2021 Taliban offensive would bring chaos to the United States. He defended Trump's decision to declare the National Emergency Concerning the Southern Border of the United States as sanctioned by the National Emergencies Act. Miller supported a binary-choice model for the family separation policy whereby families would be forced to decide whether they would (1) voluntarily allow separation from their children or (2) waive their children's humanitarian protections, thereby allowing the family to be detained together without time restriction. In Trump's second term, Miller spearheaded efforts to restrict Americans' right to sponsor their close relatives for immigration.

In May 2018, Miller blamed Democrats for the Mexico–United States border crisis. Speaking in his "personal capacity" in October 2020, Miller described Democratic nominee Joe Biden's immigration policy as "a radical outlier in the whole of human civilization". Tweeting hours after Biden's inauguration, Miller criticized Biden for what he described as "opening travel from terror hot spots, proposing a giant amnesty, [and] halting the installation of security barriers along the Southwest border". In January 2023, after Biden announced that he was moving to institute a major crackdown on immigration, Miller alleged that the president was seeking to "increase the foreign-born population of the United States as speedily as possible". Miller repeated his sentiment after Biden extended temporary protected status to Venezuelans in September 2023. Miller claimed "With a lot of these immigrant groups, not only is the first generation unsuccessful. (...) You see persistent issues in every subsequent generation. So you see consistent high rates of welfare use, consistent high rates of criminal activity, consistent failures to assimilate." Debunked by an X community note, in 2026 Miller reacted to the killing of Alex Pretti by border agents in Minneapolis with a tweet that a "would-be assassin tried to murder federal law enforcement". CNN later reported that claim had "no evidence" supporting it.

=== Foreign and domestic affairs ===
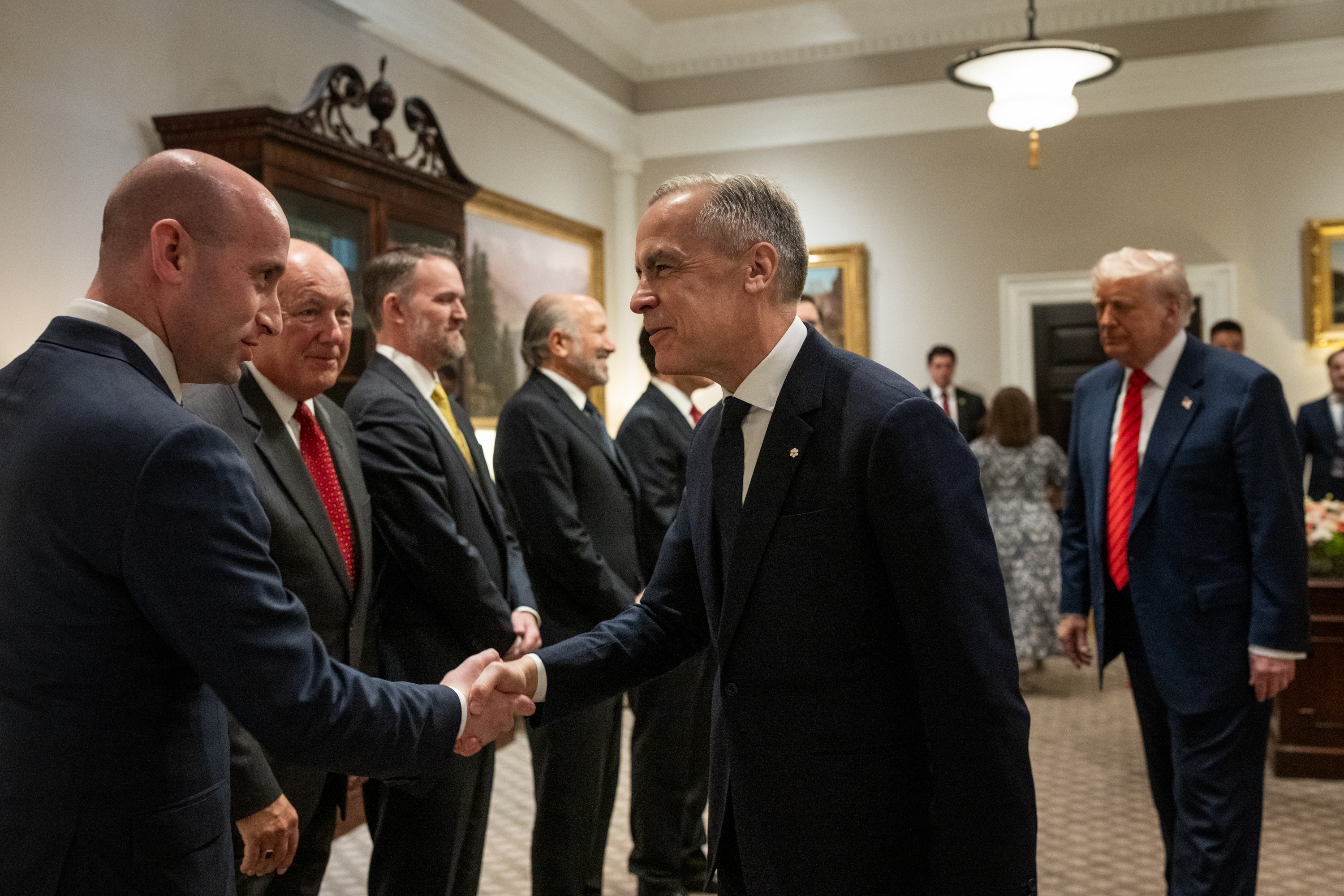
Miller shaking hands with Canadian prime minister Mark Carney in May 2025

In high school after the September 11 attacks, Miller wrote that he relished "the thought of watching Osama Bin Laden being riddled to death with bullets". In A Sacred Oath (2022), secretary of defense Mark Esper alleged that in a Situation Room meeting convened over an operation to kill Abu Bakr al-Baghdadi, the founder and first leader of the Islamic State, Miller suggested taking Baghdadi's head, dipping it in pig's blood, and parading it around to warn other terrorists. Miller denied making those remarks and referred to Esper as a "moron".

As a columnist for Duke University's student newspaper, The Chronicle, Miller wrote on conservative themes including criticism of Hollywood and the war on Christmas. Miller referred to the whistleblower who revealed the call between Ukrainian president Volodymyr Zelenskyy and Trump that led to a scandal and Trump's impeachment as a partisan "saboteur". After Trump was found guilty in a criminal trial involving his concealment of payments made to the pornographic actress Stormy Daniels, Miller urged Republican district attorneys to initiate "every investigation they need to" and Republicans on congressional committees to leverage their "subpoena power in every way" possible to defeat "Marxism and beat these Communists". After Biden's son, Hunter, was convicted on firearm charges, Miller alleged that Hunter had not been charged with failing to register as a foreign agent, in reference to the Biden–Ukraine conspiracy theory, because it would implicate his father. Miller wrote on X that Venezuela's expropriation of investments by US oil companies was the "largest recorded theft of American wealth and property."

Miller has alleged that voter fraud occurred in the 2016 and 2020 presidential elections. In February 2017, he told George Stephanopoulos on ABC News that voters had been bused into New Hampshire—a claim rejected by state political figures and officials. After Trump's loss in the 2020 election, Miller appeared on Fox News to argue that an "alternate slate of electors" could ensure Trump's victory.

Miller has accused India of effectively financing Russia's war in Ukraine by continuing to purchase large amounts of Russian oil. That remark, made in early August 2025, represents some of the strongest criticism from the Trump administration toward India.

Miller was critical of large social media companies' banning Trump or Trump-aligned organizations following the January 6 Capitol attack. In September 2025, he accused judges and politicians from the Democratic Party of being responsible for the killing of Iryna Zarutska, a Ukrainian refugee who was fatally stabbed on a train in North Carolina.

External videos
- Miller on The Lead with Jake Tapper on January 5, 2026 via Archive.org

In January 2026, after the American capture of Nicolas Maduro, Miller repeated calls for an American invasion and occupation of Greenland, claiming that "nobody is going to fight the United States militarily over the future of Greenland". Miller told reporter Jake Tapper on that subject: "We live in a world, in the real world, Jake, that is governed by strength, that is governed by force, that is governed by power. These are the iron laws of the world since the beginning of time". Greenlandic and European leaders, however, indicated their clear opposition to an American invasion, with Mette Frederiksen saying that an annexation would mean the end of NATO. Miller continued the rhetoric, claiming that "obviously Greenland should be part of the US". Republican senator Thom Tillis called Miller's remarks "amateurish," "absurd" and "insane comments about how it is our right to have territory owned by the Kingdom of Denmark," and said Trump should fire "the amateurs" who had advised him on Greenland.

Miller is a supporter of Israel and the Abraham Accords, calling them a "historic achievement". During the 2026 Iran war, Miller threatened that if Iran didn't agree to a deal, it would face military consequences "the likes of which has not been seen in modern history".

=== Race and culture ===
In high school, Miller argued that racism was fictitious and that racial segregation did not exist because it was not legally imposed, owing to the civil rights movement. In strategic plan meetings at his high school district, he decried bilingual education, multicultural activities, and announcements in Spanish. Shortly after graduating high school, Miller wrote that impoverished Islamic countries were "poor and failing" because "they have refused to embrace the values that make our country great".

In writing speeches for Trump, Miller marked a shift in language that included terms such as "radical Islamic terrorism". In an interview with The New York Times in February 2021, he criticized Joe Biden's lexicon for being politically correct, saying specifically that "the other side would say, 'What you call equity, I call discrimination.'"

According to The Atlantic, while helping Trump prepare for a debate in 2024, Miller got into an argument with an ally on immigration. Trump reportedly said, "Stephen... if you had it your way, everyone would look exactly like you", to which Miller replied "That's correct". In another incident reported by The New York Times, Trump told a campaign meeting that Miller wanted only 100 million people to live in the United States, and for all of them to look like Miller.

== Personal life ==
In February 2020, he married Katie Waldman, the press secretary to vice president Mike Pence and a former spokeswoman for Nielsen, at the Trump International Hotel Washington, D.C. Trump attended their wedding. Miller and Waldman met through mutual friends in 2018 and were engaged a year and a half later. They have four children together. Following public protests near their home in Arlington, Virginia, the second Trump administration moved them from their home to officers quarters on a nearby military base.

== Written works ==
Alongside being a columnist for the Duke Chronicle, Miller wrote several essays for FrontPage Magazine and Santa Monica Mirror, and public policies for United States senator Jeff Sessions and later Donald Trump’s 2016 presidential campaign.

- Miller, Stephen (2002), The Politics of a High School Education, FrontPage Magazine
- Miller, Stephen (2003), How I Changed My Left-wing High School, FrontPage Magazine
- Miller, Stephen (2005), Santa Monica High's Multicultural Fistfights, FrontPage Magazine
- Miller, Stephen (2006), My Dream for the End of Racism, Santa Monica Mirror
- Miller, Stephen (2006), Remembering 9/11, FrontPage Magazine
- Miller, Stephen (2015), Immigration Handbook for the New Republican Majority: A Memo For Republican Members From Sen. Jeff Sessions, Office of United States Senator Jeff Sessions
- Miller, Stephen (2015), Immigration Reform that Will Make America Great Again, Donald J. Trump for President, Inc.

== Works cited ==
=== Books ===
- Guerrero, Jean (2020). Hatemonger: Stephen Miller, Donald Trump, and the White Nationalist Agenda. New York: William Morrow. ISBN 978-0-06-298671-9.
- Harris, Jonathan, ed. (2021). Terrorism and the Arts: Practices and Critiques in Contemporary Cultural Production. Routledge. ISBN 978-0-367-74117-4.
  - Apel, Dora. "Chapter 1: The Migrant Image". In Harris (2021).
- Davis, Julie; Shear, Michael (2019b). Border Wars: Inside Trump's Assault on Immigration. New York: Simon & Schuster. ISBN 978-1-9821-1739-9.
- Leonnig, Carol; Davis, Aaron C. (2025). Injustice: How Politics and Fear Vanquished America's Justice Department. Penguin Press. ISBN 978-0-593-83137-3.
- Nilsen, Sarah; Turner, Sarah, eds. (2021). White Supremacy and the American Media. Routledge. ISBN 978-1-032-10406-5.
  - Bose, Pablo. "Chapter 9: White nationalism and the specter of the refugee". In Nilsen & Turner (2021).
- Webster, Leanne; Tazreiter, Claudia, eds. (2021). Handbook of Migration and Global Justice. Edward Elgar Publishing. ISBN 978-1-78990-565-6.
  - Kivisto, Peter. "Chapter 12: Immigration workplace raids and the politics of cruelty: the case of Postville, Iowa". In Webster & Tazreiter (2021).

=== Journals ===
- Nagel, Caroline (2025). "Immigration policy in the second Trump administration: Restriction, removal, and the limits of MAGA nativism". The Geographical Journal. 191 (4) e70015. Bibcode:2025GeogJ.19170015N. doi:10.1111/geoj.70015.
- Parmar, Inderjeet; Furse, Thomas (2023). "The Trump administration, the far-right and world politics". Globalizations. 20 (5): 799–813. Bibcode:2023Glob...20..799P. doi:10.1080/14747731.2021.1991660.
- Ratskoff, Ben (2020). "'Improbable Spectacles': White Supremacy, Christian Hegemony, and the Dark Side of the Judenfrage". Studies in American Jewish Literature. 39: 17–43. doi:10.5325/studamerjewilite.39.1.0017. JSTOR 10.5325/studamerjewilite.39.1.0017.

Political offices
Preceded by Elizabeth Sherwood-Randall	United States Homeland Security Advisor; 2025–present	Incumbent
Preceded by Susie Wiles	White House Chief of Staff; 2026–present	Incumbent
Order of precedence
Preceded by Markwayne Mullin as United States Secretary of Homeland Security	Order of precedence of the United States as White House Chief of Staff	Succeeded by Lee Zeldin as Administrator of the Environmental Protection Agency
