= João MacDowell =

Brazilian composer (born 1965)

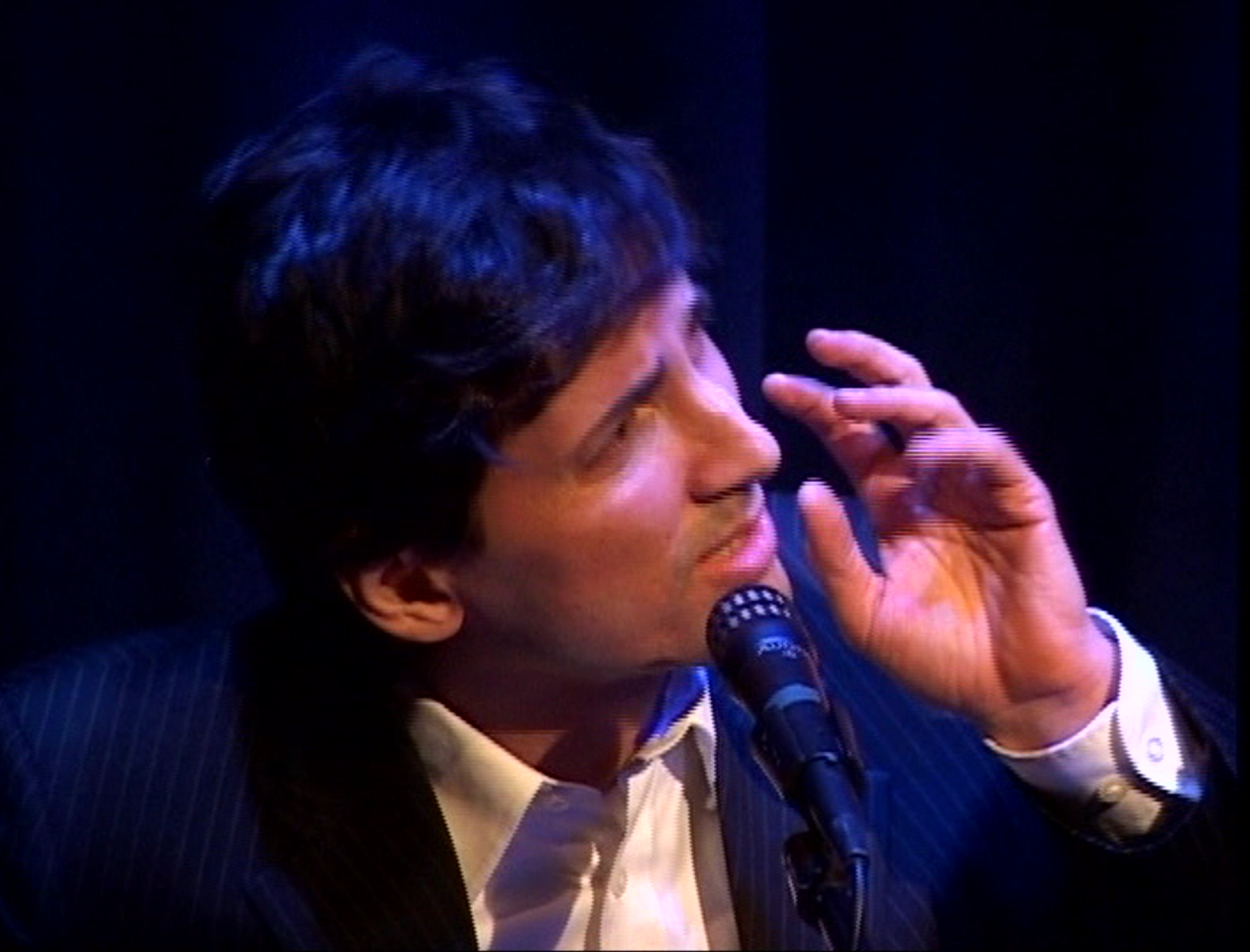
João MacDowell

João MacDowell (born 1965) is a Brazilian composer known for fusing contemporary and popular styles with classical music. His work includes opera, symphonic, chamber music, and early albums of Brazilian pop. On the occasion of the concert premiere of his fifth opera The Seventh Seal, Swedish journalist Johanna Paulsson of Dagens Nyheter noted the composer as "a new thinker in the genre".

== Life and career ==
=== Early works ===
MacDowell was born in Brasília, and started his professional career as leader and vocalist of the Brazilian cult band Tonton Macoute. The composer was in a couple of bands such as Antiperipleia and Sábado cedo não tem carne, with Brazilian artist Marcio Faraco on guitars, Cascão, from the band Detrito Federal, on drums, Pedro Hiena on bass, and the late Ric Novaes (DJ Mr. Spacely) on vocals.

The band Tonton Macoute left a mark on a generation of artists in the capital of Brazil and further. They had a track record of independent radio hits. The songs "Electric Light" and "A pele" became instant radio hits, starting at Fluminense FM, and then at Rádio Cidade and Transamerica FM. This radio exposure led to a consistent following on their performances. They also made hits on radio stations across the country, many of these stations, such as Rádio Cidade and Transamérica, would normally refuse to play independent bands, which made their achievement quite a unique feat for the time.

João Mac Dowell went on to work as a record producer and composer, working with such as Claudia Otero, Fabio Lobo, Little Quail and The Md Birds, Funk Fuckers and Rubao Sabino. He wrote soundtracks for films by Mauro Giuntinni, Katcha Donida, and others. In a peculiar practice, MacDowell would get different nicknames in different towns, adding to the number of identities that he has personified. He would also have local guests to his solo performances, often writing new material to suit the characteristics and different styles of the people he was interacting with. Over the years João MacDowell used a number of identities: Kau MacDowell, João Kahuna, jKau, João do Sertão, João do Mar, João do Mundo, Joãozinho das Candongas, Uncle Joey and his own name.

=== Solo albums: Rio de Janeiro ===
In 2000, MacDowell released his first solo album, Parece que existo ("It Seems That I Exist"). In the following years, he toured as a solo performer.

From 1998 to 2001, he was Composer in Residence with Henrique Schuller's contemporary dance company, Tabula Rasa. MacDowell wrote the score for Baldes, performed at the International Contemporary Dance Biannual (2001).

O caixeiro viajante e a caixa de música ("The Traveling Man and His Music Box", 2002) was the artist's second solo album release. An album that still preserves the popular melodic aspect of his previous works, though it points to the direction that his music would take after that. In it his audience heard for the first time the motif theme of tamanduá, with an introduction that bridges Brazilian traditional music with contemporary classical orchestration. This album brought MacDowell to tour in the United States, with performances in New York, San Francisco and Philadelphia. In Brasília and Rio de Janeiro he performed at major venues such as the Teatro Nacional and Teatro Nelson Rodrigues.

MacDowell's electronic composition "Lanterna" was selected for the Lucky Strike Lab, Contemporary Music Festival (2002). His soundtrack for the multimedia event and CD-rom A deusa by Cila MacDowell, video-artist collaborator, was presented at the Electronic Language International Festival (2002).

Also in 2002, MacDowell's score for Tecido marinho won a prize at the International Circus Festival of Belo Horizonte. This show went on to tour seventeen countries in Europe, with the Circus Chen. The music was chosen to be broadcast on a children's day TV special of Rede Globo, O circo do Huck, reaching an audience of over 10 million people.

Quarteto (2004) was MacDowell's third solo release, featuring his Brazilian-jazz band based in Rio de Janeiro. Alice em Miami (2007), an EP release followed, featuring tracks produced in Philadelphia, with Paul Atkinson and Max Laskavy at Aurum recording studios.

=== A career shift: New York ===
MacDowell's talent as composer and record producer started to be demanded internationally in 2002, and he moved permanently to New York City in 2006, where he also acts as Creative Director for Come Together Music. and also as Artistic Director of the International Brazilian Opera Company (IBOC)

In the US, MacDowell has produced a number of recordings, including: Wayne Hsu, Lydia Witman, BB, Noel Garcez, and an album of world music with various Ethiopian vocalists, co-produced by Mengistu Melese of Masinko productions.

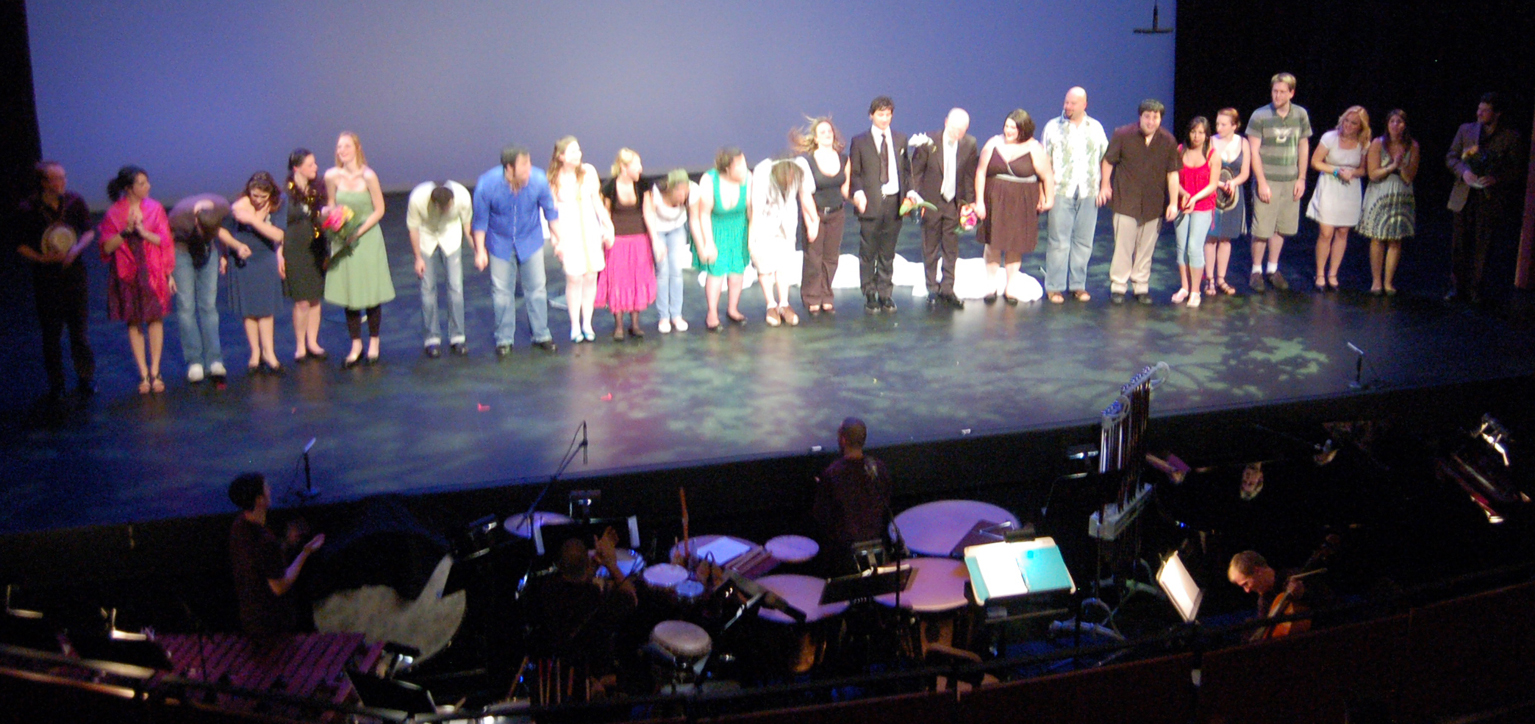
Tamanduá, NJ 2009

MacDowell has also written soundtracks for Graham Elliot's documentary Grayhound to Cuba, Debra Solomon's animation 777, 6th Ave., and Oscar-nominated director John Dilworth's Cartoon Physics, and the theater play Barry White – Guided by Destiny. Participation on TV personality, singer/songwriter Jane Norman/Pixanne 17th solo album, With Love; together, MacDowell and Norman deliver a performance of the Jobim standard "Quiet Nights", featuring a full orchestra, conducted and arranged by Grammy Award-winning arranger Richard Rome.

In New York, MacDowell has been performing as a solo artist, with his band and participating in performances of singers such as Brazilian baritone Claudio Mascarenhas with whom he did concert previews of selections from the Brazilian opera Tamanduá in 2006 and 2007. MacDowell can also be found performing as guitarist of Cuban pianist/songwriter, Alina Brouwer.

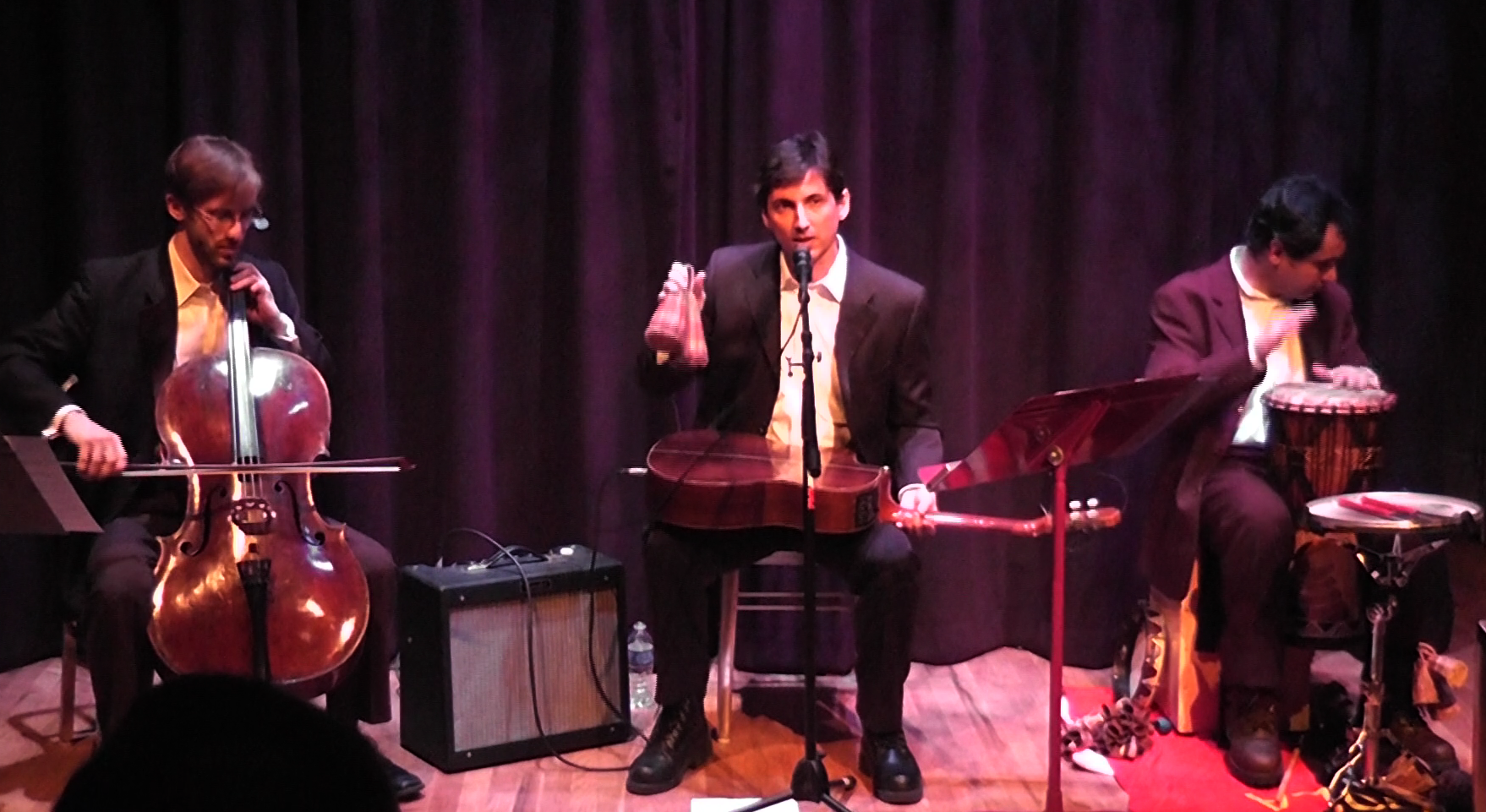
João MacDowell Trio, New York, 2011.

=== Contemporary classical: opera and symphonic music ===
In June and April, 2008, João MacDowell conducted premiere concerts of selections from Tamanduá – A Brazilian Opera in New York city. In the cast Guto Bittencourt as tenor (Pedro & The Editor), Amy Buckley as soprano (Carol), Claudio Mascarenhas as baritone (Aruanan), Abby Powell as mezzo-soprano (Julia). Tamanduá is a contemporary Brazilian operatic work that fuses folk rhythms, experimentalism, and classical composition. Scored for symphonic orchestra, choir and a cast of soloists, it draws on the tradition of operatic emotion; a total work of art that embraces dance and multimedia technologies. Tamanduá takes the audience on a psychological journey into the depths of the Brazilian soul. Like Brazil itself, it reflects cultures coming together to create something new.

In December 2009, Montclair State University, John J Cali School of Music, New Jersey, presented 16 staged scenes from Tamanduá at the Alexander Kasser Theater. The MSU Opera Workshop was directed and conducted by Jeffrey Gall, featuring videoscenography by Cila MacDowell. Clips from the performance have been made available through YouTube.

In September 2011, premiered in New York, the feature documentary Parece que existo, focused on the life and works of MacDowell, directed by Mário Salimon, shot in Portuguese, with English subtitles. In 2012, the documentary received the CLDF awards for Best Film and Best Soundtrack at the 45th Festival de Brasília do Cinema Brasileiro.

On December 17, 2012, MacDowell premiered a concert version of his chamber opera monodrama Plastic Flowers in New York City. It featured the mezzo-soprano Abby Powell in the lead role of Penelope.

On March 18, 2014, MacDowell's Symphony n.1 titled Um sonho brasileiro ("A Brazilian Dream") premiered in Brasília, with the Orquestra Sinfônica do Teatro Nacional Claudio Santoro (OSTNCS) under the baton of Maestro Claudio Cohen. Following the world premiere, the symphony received four performances in April 2014, by the Orquestra Sinfônica UniCamp conducted by Cynthia Alirete.

In 2015, the Chamber opera Cries and Whispers, a tribute to the Ingmar Bergman's film of the same name, premiered in New York. An instrumental suite with themes from the opera was presented in the opening ceremony of Bergman Week 2015. The work was composed during the composer's residency at Ingmar Bergman's estate in the island of Fårö.

In 2016, MacDowell presented a workshop in New York at Scandinavia House with the music of first act of The Seventh Seal a work in progress under contract with the Ingmar Bergman Foundation, sung in Swedish.

For The Seventh Seal opera, based on the film script by Ingmar Bergman, the composer was awarded two times with Ingmar Bergman Estate Foundation residencies at the home of the director, and performed as the closing act for the opening ceremony for the Bergman Centennial in the Fårö church, in 2018. The opera premiered in Stockholm as part of the Bergman Centennial in 2018 in concert format. Its chamber version was first presented at Stockholm's Modern Art Museum (Moderna Museet), as part of the Bergman Festival, by the Royal Dramatic Theater of Sweden (Dramaten).

The Seventh Seal was among six premieres at the 2018 Bergman Festival. The Bergman Festival was reviewed in The New York Times, with two mentions for MacDowell's work: "The composer was direct in his admiration for The Seventh Seal, adapting it into an opera that had its premiere at the festival."; "The screen-to-stage phenomenon was represented at the Dramaten festival with Mr. MacDowell's The Seventh Seal" (Elisabeth Vincentelli).

In the same year, the full version in São Paulo, with the seven soloists of the Swedish cast plus orchestra and chorus of the Tatuí Conservatory of the city. The production was sponsored by Volvo Cars and the Brazilian Ministry of Culture.

== Discography ==
- O bicho papão do Planalto – 1989 (as Tonton Macoute)
- Parece que existo – 1999 (as João Kahuna)
- O caixeiro viajante e a caixa de música – 2002 (as jKau)
- Quarteto – 2004
- Alice em Miami – 2006
- Tamanduá – 2009
- Plastic Flowers – 2012
- Symphony No. 1 – 2014
- Cries and Whispers – 2015
- The Seventh Seal – 2018
- The Cemetery of Lost Souls – 2020
