= Jimmy Hirschfeld =

American television director and producer (born 1929)

- Born: James Hahn Hirschfeld; January 9, 1929 (age 97)
- Occupations: Television director and producer
- Spouse: Janet Rubner (died 1998)
- Children: 2 including Julie Hirschfeld Davis

Jimmy Hirschfeld (born January 9, 1929) is an American television director and producer known for his work on Captain Kangaroo and Picture Pages.

== Biography ==
In 1951, Hirschfeld took a job as a stagehand with WCAU-TV under Bill Bode where he eventually worked his way up Assistant Director. In 1954, he became a staff director (under John Facenda) and then producer and director for the "Shock Theater" which starred John Zacherle. Hirschfeld was also the director of numerous WCAU-TV documentaries and for shows produced by Gene London and Jane Norman's Pixanne telecasts. He directed various shows during his career including the Philadelphia segments of the CBS Thanksgiving Parade (1959 to 1979); the annual Philadelphia Orchestra Concerts series (1960 to 1989) and; NFL Football broadcasts for CBS (which owned WCAU-TV at the time) from 1960 to 1980. In 1967, WCAU-TV named him Program Manager and Executive Producer; and in 1971, he was named Program Director. In 1973, he moved to New York City where he was the producer of CBS-TV's Captain Kangaroo. In 1978, he moved to Los Angeles where he worked for CBS-TV as the producer of the Mary Tyler Moore Comedy Hour. In 1979, he became the director of "Bill Cosby's Picture Pages also for CBS-TV; and in 1981, he returned to Captain Kangaroo serving as Director and Executive Producer for CBS-TV and then PBS.

Hirschfeld has won 3 Emmy Awards for Captain Kangaroo (1978, 1983, and 1984); and won the 1981 Gold Award at the International Film and TV Festival for Picture Pages. On November 22, 2013, he was inducted into the Broadcast Pioneers of Philadelphia's "Hall of Fame."

== Personal life ==
Hirschfeld was married to Janet Susan Rubner at Rodeph Shalom Synagogue in Philadelphia; one of their daughters is CNN political analyst Julie Hirschfeld Davis. His wife died in 1998.
