= Jean Guerrero =

American investigative journalist

- Born: March 31, 1988 (age 38); San Diego, California, U.S.
- Education: University of Southern California (BA); Goucher College (MFA)
- Occupations: Associate professor, investigative journalist, author, essayist, columnist
- Writing career
- Notable works: Crux: A Cross-Border Memoir; Hatemonger
- Website: jeanguerrero.com

Jean Carolyn Guerrero (born March 31, 1988) is an American investigative journalist, professor, author, and former foreign correspondent. Guerrero is an Associate Professor of Journalism at the USC Annenberg School for Communications and Journalism. She is the author of Crux: A Cross-Border Memoir, winner of the PEN/FUSION Emerging Writers Prize, and Hatemonger: Stephen Miller, Donald Trump, and the White Nationalist Agenda, published in 2020 by William Morrow. Guerrero's KPBS series America's Wall won an Emmy Award. Her essay, "My Father Says He's a 'Targeted Individual.' Maybe We All Are", was selected for The Best American Essays anthology of 2019.

== Early life and education ==
Guerrero was born and raised in San Diego. According to her memoir Crux, her father Marco Antonio was a mentally-unstable Mexican craftsman, and her mother Jeanette was a Puerto Rican American doctor.

She is a graduate of The Bishop's School, received a B.A. in journalism with a minor in neuroscience from the University of Southern California, and an M.F.A. in creative nonfiction from Goucher College.

== Career ==
From 2010 to 2013, Guerrero was a Mexico City bureau correspondent for The Wall Street Journal and Dow Jones Newswires, reporting on Mexico and Central America. She was an investigative reporter for KPBS in San Diego from 2015 to 2019. Guerrero has been a regular contributor to NPR, PBS NewsHour, and PRI's The World, with appearances on CNN, Democracy Now!, MSNBC, CBC, and Univision among others. Her writing has appeared in The New York Times, the Columbia Journalism Review, Vanity Fair, Wired, The Daily Beast, The Nation, and other outlets. Guerrero was an opinion columnist for the Los Angeles Times from 2022 to 2024, Guerrero is a contributing writer for The New York Times. She became an Associate Professor of Journalism at the University of Southern California in 2026. Prior to joining the faculty at USC, Guerrero was a senior journalism fellow at the UCLA Latina Futures 2050 Lab.

=== Crux: A Cross-Border Memoir ===
Crux: A Cross-Border Memoir was published in 2018 by One World: Random House. Reviewed as "a gracefully written and nuanced memoir" in The Washington Post, the book is an exploration of borders, Guerrero's father, and Guerrero's own sense of self. The book is divided into seven segments corresponding to parts of the K'iche' Maya creation story in the Popul Vuh.

=== Hatemonger: Stephen Miller, Donald Trump, and the White Nationalist Agenda ===
Hatemonger was published by William Morrow: HarperCollins in 2020. "An unsparing portrait of the young architect of Trumpian nationalism", per Kirkus Reviews, "carefully documented and persuasive. A readable study in the banality of evil, even if it comes clothed in bespoke suits." Author Francisco Cantú reviewed Hatemonger as "A vital book for understanding the still-unfolding nightmare of nationalism and racism in the 21st century."

== Personal life ==
Guerrero lives in Los Angeles, California. Her mother is a physician, and her sister Michelle Ruby is a painter and muralist.

== Bibliography ==
- Crux: A Cross-Border Memoir One World, 2018. ISBN 9780399592393
- Hatemonger: Stephen Miller, Donald Trump, and the White Nationalist Agenda. William Morrow, 2020. ISBN 9780062986719

== Awards ==
- PEN/FUSION Emerging Writers Prize for Crux: A Cross-Border Memoir
- Emmy Award from the National Academy of Television Arts & Sciences Pacific Southwest Chapter for the series America's Wall
- San Diego Press Club Excellence in Journalism Award for Investigative Reporting: Investors in Donald Trump's Failed Mexico Resort Speak Out
- San Diego Society of Professional Journalists 2019 Journalist of the Year
- Sacramento Press Club "Best Commentary" award for 2022
