= Picture Pages =

American educational television program

Animated intro, featuring a caricature of Bill Cosby.

Picture Pages was a 1978–1984 American educational television program aimed at preschool children, presented by Bill Cosby—teaching lessons on basic arithmetic, geometry, word association and drawing through a series of interactive lessons that used a workbook that viewers would follow along with the lesson.

Picture Pages was created by Julius Oleinick and started on a local Pittsburgh children's show in 1974 with the Picture Pages puzzle booklets given away at a supermarket chain. It debuted as a national segment of the Captain Kangaroo show in 1978 (then directed by Jimmy Hirschfeld), in which Captain Kangaroo would do the lessons on his "magic drawing board". Bill Cosby took over hosting the segments in 1980, presenting the lessons with a marker named "Mortimer Ichabod Marker" (M.I. for short), which was topped with a cartoon figure that played musical notes whenever he drew with it.

When the Captain Kangaroo show left CBS in 1984, the Cosby-era Picture Pages series was rerun as an interstitial program on Nickelodeon from 1984 to 1993.

The show also aired in Canada on the YTV cable network.
