= International Brazilian Opera Company =

The International Brazilian Opera Company (IBOC) is a New York-based 501(c)3 non-profit organization founded in 2014 by João MacDowell, and a group of composers, singers, visual artists, and producers. Its mission is to support the creation and development of new operatic repertoire that combines ideas from both Brazilian and international artists while providing an educational structure for new talent to emerge.

== Awards ==
Since 2014, the International Brazilian Opera has amassed yearly prizes for the graphic material of each production season.

Brazilian Opera on Graphis Inc. International Competition:

The 2014 Brazilian Opera Debut poster won Gold awards in categories Typography, Poster, and Photography

The 2015 poster for Cries and Whispers, an opera by Joao MacDowell inspired by the film by Ingmar Bergman of the same name, won the Graphis Inc. Merit Award in the category Opera Poster.

The 2016 posters for The Seventh Seal an opera by Joao MacDowell adapted from the film script by Ingmar Bergman won Platinum awards in the categories Opera Poster, Print Poster and Design. This poster is featured on the cover of the 2017 Graphis Design Catalog. Other posters for the same production have won Gold Awards in Opera Poster, Print Poser and Design categories.
