= A Proclamation on Securing the Border =

U.S. immigration secondary legislation

- Ratified: June 4, 2024
- Date effective: June 5, 2024
- Signatories: Joe Biden
- Media type: U.S. presidential proclamation
- Subject: Exclusion of aliens under Immigration and Nationality Act

A Proclamation on Securing the Border is a directive signed by U.S. president Joe Biden. Signed on June 4, 2024, the presidential proclamation allows the president to restrict the Mexico–United States border. The proclamation implements a limit on illegal immigration, effective June 5.

By June 2024, illegal crossings reached a three-year low following four consecutive monthly drops, which senior U.S. officials attributed to increased enforcement between the United States and Mexico and the weather. They also attributed Biden's executive action as having a marked impact of reducing daily apprehensions to 2,000 from May's 3,800.

== Background ==
=== Trump presidential proclamation ===
In November 2018, then-president Donald Trump issued a presidential proclamation suspending asylum rights for illegal immigrants. According to the Trump administration, the policy was intended to halt Central American migrant caravans. District judge Jon S. Tigar temporarily blocked the proclamation.

== Provisions ==
According to the Associated Press, the proclamation closes asylum requests once the average number of daily encounters reaches 2,500, reopening once that number has decreased to 1,500. Due to the threshold being met at the time of the signing, the proclamation's shutdown went into effect immediately after the proclamation was signed. It proclaimed that anyone who crossed the border illegally or without explicit authorization would be ineligible for asylum, and that migrants who don't have a credible reason for requesting asylum will be "immediately removable", which Biden administration officials anticipated that "we will be removing those individuals in a matter of days, if not hours".

== Responses ==
=== Democratic response ===
Representative Pramila Jayapal expressed disappointment to White House chief of staff Jeff Zients, and noted how the proclamation seemed to continue the harsh enforcement approach to the crisis that Donald Trump pushed for.

House Homeland Security Committee Democrat Bennie Thompson expressed concern over the impact of the proclamation on endangered and unprotected people coming to the United States for safety, and urged representatives to work on and pass lasting solutions to strengthen border security while still protecting the vulnerable.

Senator Alex Padilla of California lamented that the policies undermined American values as "an attempt to return to the same policies that were proven to fail in the Trump administration" and that there was no attempt to provide safety and support to "dreamers, farmworkers or any other documented residents in the United States". He hoped that Biden would change his mind before the election in anticipation that Hispanic and progressive voters would turn away from voting for him.

Democratic Conference Chairman and Congressional Hispanic Caucus member Pete Aguilar was concerned that instead of secure the border while creating new legal pathways for immigration, that the proclamation was only enforcing the former part of the strategy. He wished for Biden to continue to uphold programs for Temporary Protected Status, DACA, and aiding families with undocumented individuals in them.

=== Republican response ===
Several Republicans dismissed the proclamation as a political stunt in reaction to electorate polls showing immigration to be one of the Biden administration's greatest issues prior to the 2024 election.

Republican Senate minority leader Mitch McConnell said the proclamation was "like turning a garden hose on a five-alarm fire" and that it was "too little, too late". Senator Ted Cruz questioned why Biden had waited until 2024 to sign the order.

=== Human rights organizations ===
Amnesty International USA released a public statement calling the proclamation a "dangerous international precedent as a first-of-its-kind numerical cap on asylum". Director of Refugee and Migrant Rights for the organization Amy Fischer claimed the policy to be illegal under international and refugee law, rooted in xenophobia and white supremacist concepts, and would cause more cruelty, torture, violence, and death without fixing the root causes of forced migration or creating policies to keep communities housing migrants safe.

The American Civil Liberties Union planned to sue the White House over the executive action, with representative Lee Gelernt stating that the asylum ban was just as illegal as when Donald Trump's proclamation for the same actions was blocked, and would put "tens of thousands of lives at risk".

Several American organizations including the Legal Aid Society, Las Americas Immigrant Advocacy Center, Coalition for Humane Immigrant Rights, Global Refuge, Make the Road New York, the Florida Immigrant Coalition, and the Immigrant Defenders Law Center strongly condemned the proclamation. Different statements from advocacy organizations included complaints calling the proclamation a reckless, short-sighted policy, that it ignored past failures in harsh deterrence policies, that it is akin to Trump-era policies, and that it is primarily an act of political manipulation in an election year rather than a humane or rational decision.

== See also ==
- Immigration and Nationality Act Section 212(f)
- List of executive actions by Joe Biden
