= Julie Hirschfeld Davis =

American journalist (born 1975)

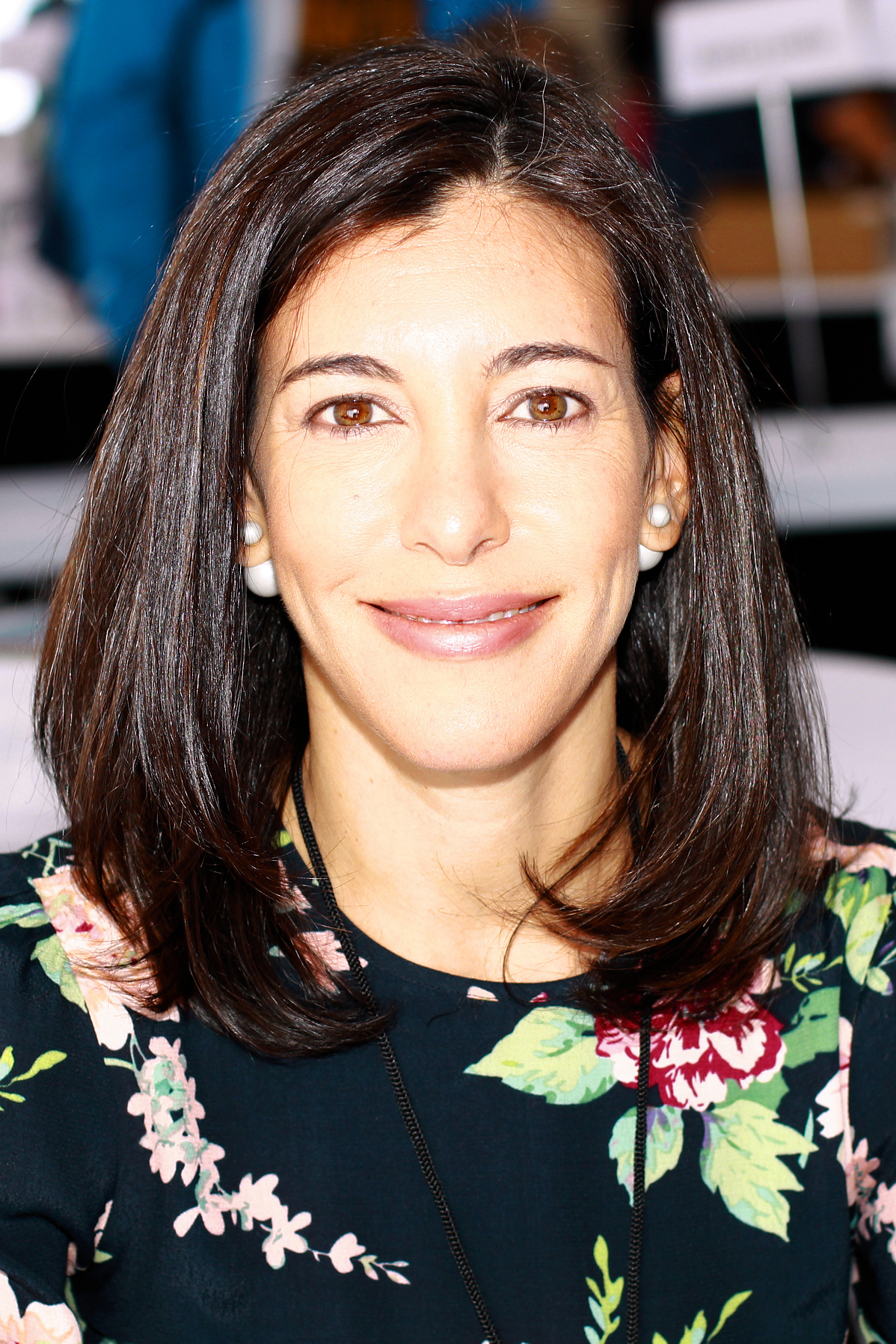
- Davis at the 2019 Texas Book Festival
- Born: April 17, 1975 (age 51); Englewood, New Jersey, U.S.
- Education: Yale University
- Occupation: Journalist
- Years active: 1998–present
- Employer: The New York Times
- Spouse: Jonathan Michael Davis (m. 2001)
- Children: 3
- Parent(s): Janet Rubner Hirschfeld; Jimmy Hirschfeld

Julie Hirschfeld Davis (born April 17, 1975) is an American journalist. She is currently the congressional editor for The New York Times and a political analyst for CNN. She was previously a White House correspondent.

== Early life ==
Davis was born on April 17, 1975, to parents Janet (née Rubner) and Jimmy Hirschfeld in Englewood, New Jersey. She attended the Ethical Culture Fieldston School in New York City, where she became the editor of The Fieldston News in her junior year, and later received a B.A. degree in Ethics, Politics and Economics from Yale University in 1997.

== Career ==
Davis's first foray into journalism came aged 10, when she interviewed the hot dog man on the corner in front of her elementary school for a feature for her after-school programme, but her first proper role came after she graduated from Yale and secured an internship at the Washington bureau of The Dallas Morning News in 1998.

She continued to cover Capitol Hill as a senior writer at Congressional Quarterly until 2002, when she was for the first time appointed White House correspondent for The Baltimore Sun. Davis switched to being a political reporter in 2007 for the Associated Press, and then in 2011, for Bloomberg.

In 2009, she won the Everett McKinley Dirksen Award for Distinguished Reporting of Congress for her coverage of the federal response to the 2008 financial crisis.

Davis became a White House correspondent for The New York Times in 2014, ahead of the 2016 US Presidential Election. She was appointed Congressional correspondent for The Times in 2018. She is a regular political analyst at CNN, but has also appeared on MSNBC.

In 2018, Davis appeared in the fly-on-the-wall documentary The Fourth Estate, released by Showtime, which focused on The Times' coverage of the first year of the Donald Trump administration.

Her book, Border Wars: Inside Trump's Assault on Immigration, co-written with Michael D. Shear, was published by Simon & Schuster in October 2019.

== Personal life ==
Davis married Jonathan Michael Davis at the Yale Club of New York City in Manhattan in 2001. Her husband is also a graduate of Yale University with a magna cum laude.
