= Immigration and Nationality Act Section 212(f) =

Part of United States immigration law

Section 212(f) of the Immigration and Nationality Act of 1952 allows the U.S. President to disallow entry of aliens deemed "detrimental to the interests of the United States". It was invoked by President Ronald Reagan in 1981 as authorization for Executive Order 12324, by Donald Trump in 2018 as authorization for Migrant Protection Protocols, and by Joe Biden in 2024 as authorization for the measures listed in A Proclamation on Securing the Border.

== Text ==
As codified in 8 U.S.C. § 1182(f), the section reads, in part:

Whenever the President finds that the entry of any aliens or of any class of aliens into the United States would be detrimental to the interests of the United States, he may by proclamation, and for such period as he shall deem necessary, suspend the entry of all aliens or any class of aliens as immigrants or nonimmigrants, or impose on the entry of aliens any restrictions he may deem to be appropriate.
