= Julia Hahn =

American government employee

- Born: April 1, 1991 (age 35)
- Education: University of Chicago (BA)
- Occupation: Journalist

Julia Aviva Hahn (born April 1, 1991) is an American writer and political advisor. She previously served as Assistant Secretary for Public Affairs at the United States Department of Treasury during the second Trump administration and Deputy White House Communications Director in the first Trump administration.

== Early life ==
Hahn was born to a Jewish family, and grew up in Beverly Hills. She attended Harvard-Westlake School in Los Angeles.

Hahn then enrolled at the University of Chicago where she earned a Bachelor of Arts in philosophy. While a student, she also studied in Paris. Hahn's senior thesis at the University of Chicago was on "issues at the intersection of psychoanalysis and post-Foucauldian philosophical inquiry".

== Career ==
Hahn started her career as producer for The Laura Ingraham Show, eventually becoming executive producer of the show. Hahn then became press secretary for Virginia Congressman Dave Brat, who gained national prominence for defeating House Majority Leader Eric Cantor in a 2014 primary election. Former White House strategist Steve Bannon credited Hahn with playing a significant role in "plotting the Dave Brat campaign."

In 2015, Hahn began working at Breitbart News as a writer, where she wrote on immigration and trade policy. Following Bannon's appointment as White House Chief Strategist, Hahn joined the Trump administration in January 2017 as a special assistant to the president and deputy policy strategist. She remained in the White House after Bannon's departure and until the end of Trump's first term. In August 2020, Hahn served as Deputy White House Communications Director. She also served as Director of Rapid Response and Surrogate Operations. According to The New York Times, on entering the White House at age 25, Hahn's financial disclosure forms indicate she had some $1.5 million in stocks including investments in PepsiCo and the State of Israel Bond, as well as a Custodial Bank Account for minors containing between $500,000–$1 million.

In April 2017, Hahn was named Washingtonian's "40 Under 40" list stating, "in three years, Hahn has cemented her status as a conservative-media fixture." She was described by the Washington Post as "Steve Bannon's right-hand woman" and the New Yorker called her "Bannon's Bannon." Ann Coulter described Hahn as "the most wonderful, brilliant, kind principled human being I've ever met." In August 2020, the New York Times reported that Hahn prepared the briefing binder with talking points and counterarguments for White House Press Secretary Kayleigh McEnany. In McEnany's memoir, she noted Hahn would prepare her before press briefings.

In October 2020, Hahn helped lead the White House's communication strategy for the confirmation of Supreme Court Justice Amy Coney Barrett, working with the White House Counsel's office. In January 2021, Hahn was hired to U.S. Senator Bill Hagerty's staff, where she served as Deputy Chief of Staff for Communications.

Following Trump's reelection, she was appointed Assistant Secretary of Public Affairs at the U.S. Department of the Treasury by Secretary Scott Bessent. During her tenure at the Treasury, she worked on trade matters, sanctions, and tax policy. In August 2025, Hahn ended her tenure at the Treasury Department to establish a public affairs and communications firm in Washington, D.C.. Following her departure, Bessent stated Hahn displayed "unwavering dedication and exceptional service in advancing our mission to strengthen America's economic prosperity." White House Press Secretary Karoline Leavitt described her as a "fierce advocate" who helped "advance the president's mission to put American workers and families first, and get critically needed tax cuts signed into law."
