= Jane Norman (actress) =

American actress (1933/34–2017)

- Jane Norman as “Pixanne” in the Enchanted Forest.
- Born: Jane Lazarus; 1933 or 1934; Philadelphia, Pennsylvania, U.S.
- Died: May 13, 2017; Bala Cynwyd, Pennsylvania, U.S.
- Education: Temple University
- Occupation: Actress
- Known for: Pixanne TV show
- Spouse: Jack Beazley

Jane Lazarus Norman (1933 or 1934 - May 13, 2017) was an actress best known for her role as Pixanne in the children's television program of that same name that was broadcast in Philadelphia, Pennsylvania, in the 1960s.

== Early years ==
Born in Philadelphia, Norman was an only child, the daughter of Stanley and Jeanette Lazarus. Her father worked in the children's-dress-manufacturing business, and her mother was a musician who was trained in Europe. Norman was considered a child prodigy after she sat at a piano when she was 3 years old and played a Mozart sonata by ear. From that experience followed what Norman decades later described as "a lifelong love of music." When she was 8, she composed "Sad Story", a musical work that was performed by the Philadelphia Orchestra. When she was 16 years old, she headed to Maine by herself and lied about her age in order to work in summer stock theater.

After graduating from Olney High School in Philadelphia, Norman earned a Bachelor of Science degree in early childhood education at Temple University with a minor in radio-TV-theater. While at Temple, she acted in the University of the Air and the Studio Schoolhouse, both of which Temple produced and WFIL radio broadcast.

She then became a kindergarten teacher and taught at Shoemaker School in Cheltenham Township, Pennsylvania.

== Television ==
Having her kindergarten students act out stories and put on plays, and writing songs for the students awakened an interest in a different direction for Norman's career, A meeting with executives at WCAU-TV in Philadelphia led to the creation of Pixanne, a show whose main character was essentially a female version of Peter Pan. Norman explained that the program centered around a pixie because from childhood she had wanted to fly.

Initially broadcast in black and white, the program began airing in color, six days every week, beginning at 9:00 a.m. on Monday, November 21, 1966.

The children's program eventually branched out from Philadelphia and into television syndication. Relocating to New York, it found a new home there with WNEW-TV as the flagship station, and was carried in seventy-five cities, across the United States, including on television stations in: California, Illinois, Iowa, Louisiana, Maryland, Massachusetts, Mississippi, Missouri, Oklahoma, Tennessee, Texas, Washington, and Wisconsin.

Ultimately, Norman's show lasted seventeen years. At one point, it attracted sixty-one percent of the viewing audience in the Philadelphia market. Soon after it began, Pixanne's ratings exceeded those of Captain Kangaroo, which preceded it daily.

Norman became Pixanne for viewers to such an extent that a newspaper article contained the comment: "Pixanne is Jane Norman, and Jane Norman is Pixanne. And while it is possible to separate the two, the quality of each is the catalyst that has created this unique symbol of perpetual youthful innocence."

During her show's run, Norman also wrote and performed in special, holiday-themed shows which featured Pixanne and her Enchanted Forest friends, including "Pixanne's Christmas Fantasy," which aired at 5:30 p.m. on WCAU on December 23, 1967. Skits involved Pixanne's time travel back to Philadelphia during colonial times, where she visited a toymaker's shop with antique dolls and toy soldiers, a blacksmith's shop where horses were being shoed, a tailor's shop where period clothing was being sewn, and the shops of a butcher, baker and candlestick maker. Pixanne also became the first local children's television show to be filmed at major world events, including at the World's Fair in New York and at Expo '67 in Canada, and gave children the opportunity to watch segments about the Ice Capades and the Moscow Circus, both of which were filmed on location while the groups were on tour on the East Coast.

Norman's experience with Pixanne led her to produce The National Kid's Quiz series, which was broadcast on NBC. She and her husband also made 117 episodes of Maintenance Ms., a series of 90-second TV spots designed to help women cope with various aspects of household maintenance.

== Civic affairs and public service activities ==
In 1974, Norman became a goodwill ambassador for Lancaster County, Pennsylvania when she signed a contract with Earl Clark to promote Dutch Wonderland and other family-friendly, historical or recreational sites throughout the county and boost county tourism. As an official spokesperson for Dutch Wonderland, she played a key role in the theme park's annual Memorial Day re-opening ceremonies that year. She also toured the United States, speaking about county attractions and tourism issues on local news and talk show programs in Boston, Chicago and other towns and major metropolitan areas. She then continued her ambassador work in subsequent years.

== Writing ==
Norman wrote the books The Private Life of the American Teenager. and Jane Norman’s Fix It and Save, a spinoff of the Maintenance Ms. TV spots.

== Singing ==
While making Pixanne, Norman wrote, produced, and sang on two albums, The Musical Magic of Pixanne and Bloop or Blink.

In the 1990s, she launched a singing career, performing in nightclubs and recording. Her first CD, Pixanne Sings for Adults ... In a Christmas Mood, included five of Norman's compositions in addition to seven Christmas standards. That Christmas album was followed by Madly in Love, featuring "lush, sensuous standards" with accompaniment by a 47-piece orchestra.

She also sang for the Great American Audio Corp. with several children's cassettes.

== Personal life ==
A resident of a condominium in a high-rise building near City Avenue in Bala Cynwyd in later life, Norman had spent a major portion of her youth and adulthood in the Philadelphia area. "When I was 8 years old, the Philadelphia Orchestra played one of my compositions at a children's concert," she recalled during a 2011 newspaper interview. Her husband, Frank C. Beazley, was the sales director at WCAU, the television station where her Pixanne character first came to life. After residing for many years in Gladwyne, she and her husband relocated to a condominium, which was described by The Philadelphia Inquirer as a dramatic, "urban chic" space featuring a "wide-open living room with a wall of windows overlooking two patios, and a palette of beiges and whites punctuated by splashes of color in accessories and art." One of the room's focal points was an abstract painting by Calman Shemi, an Israeli artist.

The couple also owned a home in Palm Springs, California. Ailing with Parkinson's disease and prostate cancer, her husband's health continued to decline between 2008 and 2010. It was during this phase of their lives that Norman became active in the hospice movement, and helped to raise funds for the Home Care Network/Main Line Health/Jefferson Health System. Her husband died at their Palm Springs home on March 4, 2010.

== Death ==
On May 13, 2017, Norman died at her home in Bala Cynwyd, Pennsylvania. She was 83 years old. At her request, there was no funeral service or memorial event held.

== Recognition ==
On November 18, 2005, Norman was inducted into the Hall of Fame of the Broadcast Pioneers of Philadelphia.
