= Michael D. Shear =

American journalist

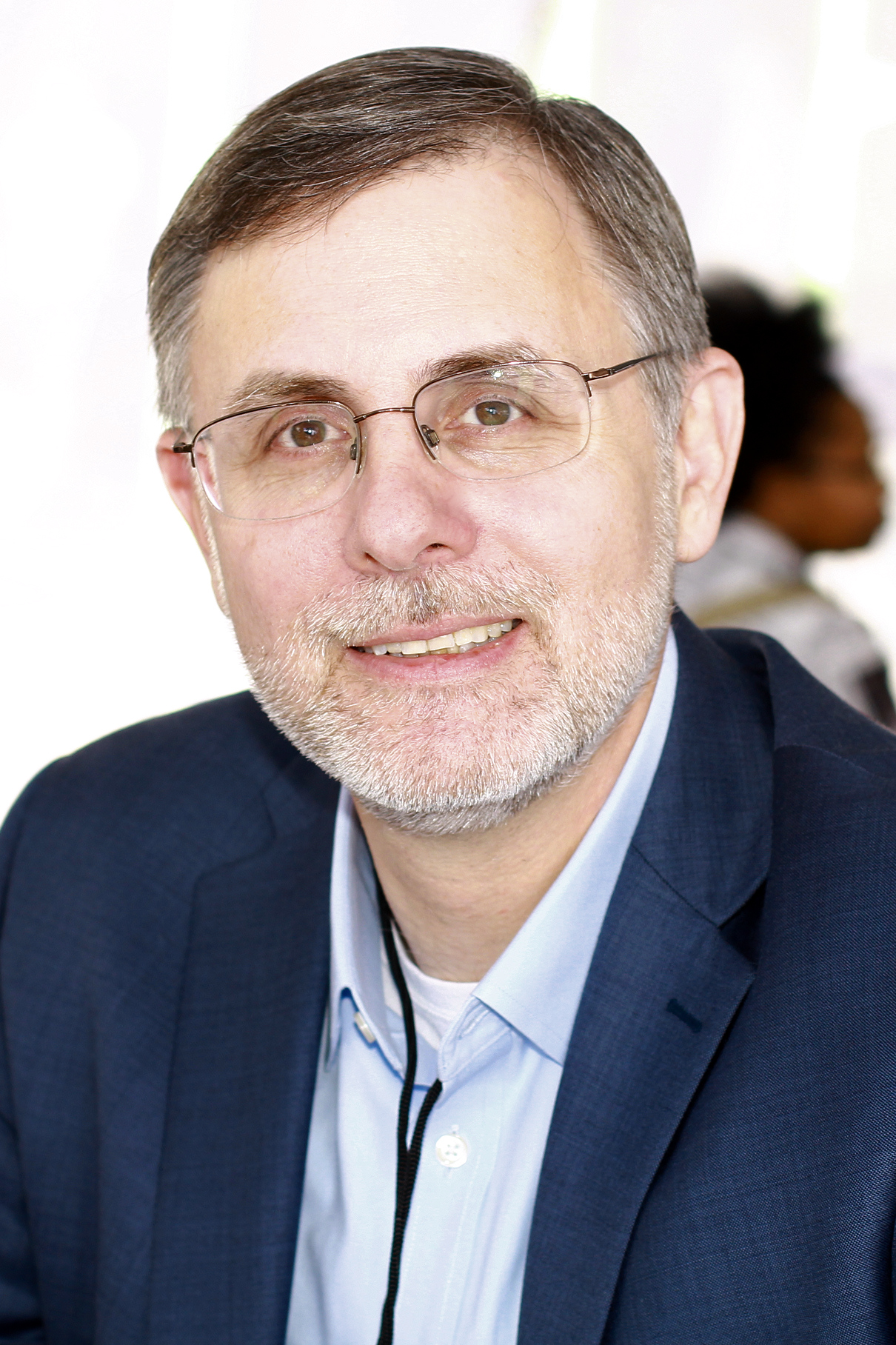
- Shear at the 2019 Texas Book Festival
- Education: Claremont McKenna College (BA); Harvard University (MPP)
- Occupation: Journalist
- Years active: 1989-present
- Employer: The New York Times
- Awards: Pulitzer Prize for Breaking News Reporting (2008); Pulitzer Prize for Public Service (2021)

Michael D. Shear is an American journalist who is the chief United Kingdom correspondent for The New York Times. He was previously a White House correspondent.

== Early life and education ==
Raised in the San Francisco Bay Area, Shear attended Homestead High School in Cupertino, California. Shear received a Bachelor of Arts degree from Claremont McKenna College in 1990 and later earned a Master of Public Policy degree from the John F. Kennedy School at Harvard University.

== Career ==
Shear's reporting career began in 1989, when he was a junior in college and interned at the Los Angeles Times' Washington bureau covering hearings on Capitol Hill and other high-profile stories, including the trial of Oliver North and the anniversary of cameras in Congress. After graduation, he worked briefly as a reporter for the San Jose Mercury News before returning to full-time education to pursue a degree in public policy.

He returned to reporting by first writing for The Tampa Tribune before taking up a more permanent role as a metro reporter at The Washington Post in 1992. He was part of the team that won a Pulitzer Prize in 2008 for coverage of the Virginia Tech shootings.

In 2010, Shear moved to the Washington bureau of The New York Times as a political correspondent. He covered Barack Obama's re-election campaign in 2012 and in 2013 returned to his role as a White House correspondent for the Times. He covered the 2016 presidential election. After the election, Shear reported on domestic policy and President Donald Trump. He also made regular appearances as a political commentator on radio and television.

His book, Border Wars: Inside Trump's Assault on Immigration, co-written with Julie Hirschfield Davis, was published by Simon & Schuster in October 2019.

He was a leading member of the team at the Times that won the 2021 Pulitzer Prize for Public Service for COVID-19 pandemic reporting. In 2025, Shear began a new role in London as a senior U.K. correspondent.

== Personal life ==
Shear lives in London, with his wife. They have two children.
