= Michelle Guerrero =

Mexican folk artist

Michelle Guerrero (born 1989), also known as Mr. B Baby, is a Chicana public artist.

== Biography ==
Guerrero was born and raised in Chula Vista, California. Her parents are Mexican and Puerto Rican, and these two cultures influence the iconography in her visual work. She earned a Bachelor of Fine Arts from the Academy of Art University San Francisco

== Art ==
Guerrero aka Mr. B Baby is recognized for highlighting Latino iconography and children's literature in her art and public art. Her creative journey was profoundly influenced by her Latin roots, fascination with children's literature, and immersion in street art culture. Her images are a fusion of Mexican cultural elements and personal experiences, showcasing surreal, colorful, and humorously Latin compositions. Symbolism played a pivotal role in her art, notably represented through the metaphor of piñatas symbolizing growth amidst adversity.
