= Pixanne =

- Genre: Children's television
- Created by: Jane Norman
- Based on: Peter Pan
- Starring: Jane Norman
- Country of origin: United States
- Original language: English
- No. of seasons: 16 total (9 original, 7 syndicated)

Production
- Producers: Pixanne Productions, New York (during syndication years)
- Cinematography: Taped before a live audience of children on Friday evenings, beginning at 7:30 p.m., the show opened with shots of Pixanne "flying" onto and off of the television stage, and aired weekly on Saturday mornings at 8:00 a.m.

Original release
- Network: WCAU-TV, Philadelphia, Pennsylvania
- Release: 1960 – 1969

Pixanne was a children's television program, created and hosted by singer-actress Jane Norman, that ran from 1960 to 1969 on WCAU-TV in Philadelphia, Pennsylvania. It was then syndicated nationally, and ran for another seven years.

During the show's run, Norman also wrote and performed in special, holiday-themed shows featuring Pixanne and her Enchanted Forest friends. Pixanne also became the first local children's television show to be filmed at major world events, including at the World's Fair in New York and at Expo '67 in Canada.

== Beginning ==
External videos
- Pioneers of Philadelphia Broadcasting Jane Norman Pixanne, Broadcast Pioneers, 29:45, January 4, 2017

The show began when Norman, a onetime child prodigy who had been playing and composing music since she was 3 years of age, contacted one of her professors from Temple University, where Norman was majoring in Early Childhood Education and minoring in Radio, TV and Theatre. In addition to being a member of Temple's faculty, her professor was also working at what was then WFIL and later became WPVI-TV. Norman, who had taught kindergarten at the Shoemaker School in Cheltenham Township after graduating from Temple, pitched a possible children's program featuring a Peter Pan-like character to her former professor. Knowing there were no openings available at WFIL, he suggested that she approach the management of the then-CBS-owned-and-operated station WCAU-TV. Norman walked in with no appointment, described the show to the program director, and, within three weeks, was on the air with her new show, which quickly achieved a loyal following of children and their parents.

== Features ==
Norman appeared on the show as a "pixie" with a green outfit, tights and a hat with a feather. She worked out a method of "flying" using a similar apparatus to that which Mary Martin had used as Peter Pan, but with only one wire supporting her instead of the several that had harnessed Martin on stage. Producers of Norman's show, in fact, actually hired theatrical flight specialist Peter Foy, who had designed the "flying" technology for Martin and other Broadway actresses, in order to build Norman's rigging for television. When interviewed about the experience later in life, Norman recalled that perfecting the technique was quite painful, but proved so effective as to be maintained for the entire run of the program.

Taped before a live audience of children on Friday evenings, beginning at 7:30 p.m., the show aired on Saturday mornings at 8:00 a.m. The show became so popular that admission to the set was by ticket only. Each show opened with Norman "flying" onto and off the set, which was designed to appear to young viewers as an enchanted forest with a stepping-stone path meandering through the forest's flowers, Spanish moss-draped trees and toadstools.

The supporting cast of puppets included Oggie Owl, Fliffy Butterfly, Herkimer, Tearesa, Galumpagus, Dandy Lion, and the puppets of Addis Williams. Pixanne had at least two alter-egos as well — one was a witch called Windy, whom Norman also acted out. Guest appearances included singer Tiny Tim.

Songs Norman sang on the show included "Swinging on a Star," "If I Knew You Were Comin' I'd've Baked a Cake," "I've Gotta Crow" from the 1954 musical Peter Pan, "Look at That Face" from the musical The Roar of the Greasepaint - The Smell of the Crowd, and "Beautiful Things" from the 1967 movie Doctor Dolittle. The show's background music included Maurice Ravel's Le Tombeau de Couperin and a selection from Carl Orff's Music for Children, the theme of Pixanne's daily cartoon introduction with her march with a magical flag. On the show, Norman also introduced adventure films and made children's crafts, such as puppets and hats.

Initially broadcast in black and white, the program began airing in color, six days every week, beginning at 9:00 a.m. on Monday, November 21, 1966.

Norman also wrote and performed in special, holiday-themed shows that featured Pixanne and her Enchanted Forest friends, including "Pixanne's Christmas Fantasy," which aired at 5:30 p.m. on WCAU on December 23, 1967. Skits involved Pixanne's time travel back to Philadelphia during colonial times, where she visited a toymaker's shop with antique dolls and toy soldiers, a blacksmith's shop where horses were being shoed, a tailor's shop where period clothing was being sewn, and the shops of a butcher, baker and candlestick maker. Pixanne also became the first local children's television show to be filmed at major world events, including at the World's Fair in New York and at Expo '67 in Canada, and gave children the opportunity to watch segments about the Ice Capades and the Moscow Circus, both of which were filmed on location while the groups were on tour on the East Coast

Pixanne received ratings of 10-12 and a 62% share of audience near the end of its run.

== Cancellation and syndication ==
When WCAU management changed in 1969, the new management took Pixanne off the air, despite it still being the television network's second most popular daytime program (second only to the nationally syndicated soap opera, As the World Turns) and despite the protests of millions of viewers. The show's cancellation resulted in a negative letter writing campaign, directed at the television station, by parents of children who still regularly watched the program. Sensitive to the emotions of the children who were saddened by the loss of her television show, Norman wrote and sang a new song for the final episode of the series, "I'll Always Love You, No Matter Where I Go."

The show quickly returned when it came back in syndication. Relocating to New York, it found a new home there with WNEW-TV as the flagship station, and was watched by children across the United States, including on television stations in: California, Illinois, Iowa, Louisiana, Maryland, Massachusetts, Mississippi, Missouri, Oklahoma, Tennessee, Texas, Washington, and Wisconsin.

The show then finally went off the air in 1976.

=== Civic affairs and public service activities ===
In 1974, Norman, in character as Pixanne, became a goodwill ambassador for Lancaster County, Pennsylvania. After signing a contract with Earl Clark to promote Dutch Wonderland and other family-friendly or historical sites throughout the county and boost county tourism, "Pixanne" became an official spokesperson for Dutch Wonderland, playing a key role in the theme park's annual Memorial Day re-opening ceremonies that year. She also toured the United States, speaking about county attractions and tourism issues on local news and talk show programs in Boston, Chicago and other towns and major metropolitan areas. She then continued her ambassador work in subsequent years.

== Norman's later career ==
Jane Norman went on to produce family-oriented network television shows, including The National Kids’ Quiz, which Michael Landon moderated on NBC. She also wrote a 1981 book with Dr. Myron Harris, The Private Life of the American Teenager, and appeared on more than 95 radio and television talk shows to promote it.

The Broadcast Pioneers of Philadelphia inducted Norman into their Hall of Fame 2005.

Norman died at her home in Bala Cynwyd, Pennsylvania on May 13, 2017, at the age of eighty-three.
