= List of public art in Kirkland, Washington =

This is a list of public art in Kirkland, Washington.

This list applies only to works of public art accessible in an outdoor public space. For example, this does not include artwork visible inside a museum.

Most of the works mentioned are sculptures. When this is not the case (sound installation, for example) it is stated next to the title.

Title	Artist	Year	Location/GPS Coordinates	Material	Dimensions	Notes
The Storyteller	Richard Beyer	1987 (installed)	5808 Lake Washington Blvd NE; 47.6602°N 122.2062°W	Cast aluminum	8.5 x 18 x 8 ft.	
The Homecoming	Stanley Bleifeld	1992	Marina Park; 47.6748°N 122.2081°W	Bronze		
Centennial Fountain	James Herbert FitzGerald	1972	Marina Park; 47.6755°N 122.2085°W	Bronze	13 ft. x 41 in. x 46 in	
The Water Bearers	Glenna Goodacre	1994 (dedicated)	David Brink Park; 47.6711°N 122.2059°W	Bronze	8 x 19 x 19 ft.	
Puddle Jumpers	Glenna Goodacre	1989	Marina Park; 47.6757°N 122.2088°W	Bronze	68 in. x 12 ft. x 41 in.	
Changing Workplace, Yesterday, Today, Tomorrow	John Hoge and Richard Beyer	ca. 1985	Lake Washington Institute of Technology East Building (outside); 47.7045°N 122.1676°W	Granite	84 x 144 x 84 in.	
The First Romance	Monyo Mihailescu-Nasturel	1992 (dedicated)	Houghton Beach Park; 47.6602°N 122.2067°W	Bronze	48 x 52 x 48 in.	
Leap Frogging	Monyo Mihailescu-Nasturel	1991	Marsh Park; 47.6651°N 122.2073°W	Bronze	53 x 69 x 44 in.	
Mountain Comrades	Dan Ostermiller	1989	Corner Kirkland Avenue and State Street; 47.6754°N 122.2037°W	Bronze	12 x 60 x 68 in.	
Close Quarters	Dan Ostermiller	1990	Corner Central Way and Lake Street; 47.6764°N 122.2073°W	Bronze	62 x 77 x 52 in.	
Winter	Peter Skinner		Houghton Beach Park; 47.6594°N 122.2071°W	Finnish granite	Sculpture: 72 x 30 x 48 in.; Base: approx. 22 x 45 x 70 in.	
Spring	Peter Skinner		Houghton Beach Park; 47.6610°N 122.2067°W	Finnish granite		
Wind Gyro #2	Bob Becker		Forbes Creek Fire Station; 47.6954°N 122.2098°W			
Betty Lou	Lisa Sheets	ca. 1994	Banner Bank, Kirkland Ave. and Main Street; 47.6758°N 122.2048°W	Bronze		
Carousel	Richard Beyer	ca. 1995	Downtown library 47.6757°N 122.2030°W	Cast aluminum		
Bounding Mule Deer	Dan Ostermiller		Lake Washington Blvd and Lakeview Drive; 47.6571°N 122.2049°W	Bronze		
Circulations	Christine Bourdette		Totem Lake freeway station47.7150°N 122.1862°W	Steel and granite		
Cow and Coyote	Brad Rule	ca. 2002	Corner of Central Way and Lake Street South; 47.6767°N 122.2073°W	Bronze		Traditionally dressed in whimsical costumes on holidays by city residents since 2011
The Fisherman	Richard Beyer	ca. 1998	Waverly Beach Park; 47.6864°N 122.2157°W	Cast aluminum		
Gateway	Wayne Chabre		City of Kirkland Annex Building, 302 1st Street; 47.6774°N 122.2081°W	Copper		
Giving Back	Kate Martin	ca. 2002	Park Lane and Lake Street South; 47.6759°N 122.2066°W	Bronze fountain		
Matador	Micajah Bienvenu		Corner 3rd Street and 10th Ave; 47.6829°N 122.2039°W			
Ontar	Anthony Howe		Juanita Village; 47.7045°N 122.2107°W	Stainless steel, copper and fiberglass		
Rac-o-Lom	Anthony Howe		Juanita Village; 47.7045°N 122.2107°W	Stainless steel and fiberglass		
Reverb	Anthony Howe		Lake Street South; 47.6741°N 122.2061°W	Stainless steel		
Gesture #1	John Hoge		Carillon Woods Park; 47.6573°N 122.1988°W	Basalt		
The Gossips	Louise McDowell		Peter Kirk Park; 47.6770°N 122.2009°W	Bronze		
Last Gift	Dennis Brown	ca. 2003	88 Kirkland Avenue; 47.6754°N 122.2070°W	Concrete		
Nesting	Rosie Sandifer		Park Lane; 47.6761°N 122.2062°W	Bronze		Relocated 2015?
Of Grace	Leo Osborne		Park Lane; 47.6761°N 122.2062°W	Bronze		
Fountain and post-tensioned obelisk	John Hoge	2003	Lake Washington Institute of Technology Technology Center (outside); 47.7052°N 122.1680°W	Granite		
The Natural	Gary Price	ca. 2002	Peter Kirk Park ballfield 47.6771°N 122.2031°W	Bronze		
Social Intricacy/The Beach	Carolyn Law	ca. 2011	Kirkland Transit Center; 47.6763°N 122.2032°W	Granite		
Rainwater fountain	John Hoge	ca. 2006	Ben Franklin Elementary; 47.6621°N 122.173°W	Basalt		
Patination	Julie Speidel		11250 Kirkland Way; 47.6789°N 122.1882°W			
Vessel Grouping fountain	John Hoge	2010	Kirkland Avenue and Lake Street; 47.6754°N 122.2063°W	Red and black granite glacial erratic boulders		Cully Ewing credited as assistant on plaque
Sun Signs; July	Sharon Bender	1989	Kirkland Public Library (garden) 47.6756°N 122.2026°W	Bronze on granite base	102 inches (2,600 mm) tall	
Oceanic (mural)	Dayton Claudio	2005	Kirkland Public Library (exterior south wall) 47.6758°N 122.2030°W	Cast epoxy/fiberglass		Artist sued United States to display piece that was offensive to Senator Jesse Helms.
Pump-to-gram (two-dimensional illustration)	W. Scott Trimble	2014	Metro pump station 3rd Street and Park Lane 47.6765°N 122.2037°W	Powder‐coated and painted steel and aluminum, cast glass		
Sidewalk stepping stones	Benson Shaw	2014	Central Way pedestrian bulbs at Lake Street and Main Street 47.6765°N 122.2069°W47.6770°N 122.2050°W	Glass, ceramic and metal mosaic		
Birdhouses	Piper O'Neill	2008	Kirkland Avenue and Main Street 47.6755°N 122.2051°W	Etched steel with laser‐cut figures		Artist also created SIFF's Golden Space Needle Award.
The Spikes	Merrily Dicks	2017 (installed)	Cross Kirkland Corridor at NE 85th Street 47.6794°N 122.1901°W	Railroad spikes reclaimed from former BNSF line	Three 6–8 ft (1.8–2.4 m) columns rising from 4 ft × 4 ft (1.2 m × 1.2 m) metal base	First installation on Cross Kirkland Corridor trail; sculpture created by Lake Washington Institute of Technology welding student
Crane in its Vigilance	Matt Babcock	2016	Kirkland Justice Center 47.706581°N 122.184781°W	Bronze and glass fiber reinforced concrete.	17'H x 11'W x 5'D. Weight 2800 lbs	
Frog Xing	Will Schlough	2022	Cross Kirkland Corridor 47.689582°N 122.194242°W	Welded stainless-steel		
