= Fremont Arts Council =

Arts organization in Seattle

- Established: 1979
- Legal status: 501(c)3 non-profit, registered in Washington State
- Purpose: art, artists, and community
- Location(s): Powerhouse; 3940 Fremont Ave N, Seattle, WA 98103
- Website: fremontartscouncil.org

The Fremont Arts Council (FAC) is a community-run organization that supports arts and artists. The Council resides at the Powerhouse in Fremont, Seattle, Washington with members throughout the city.

== History ==
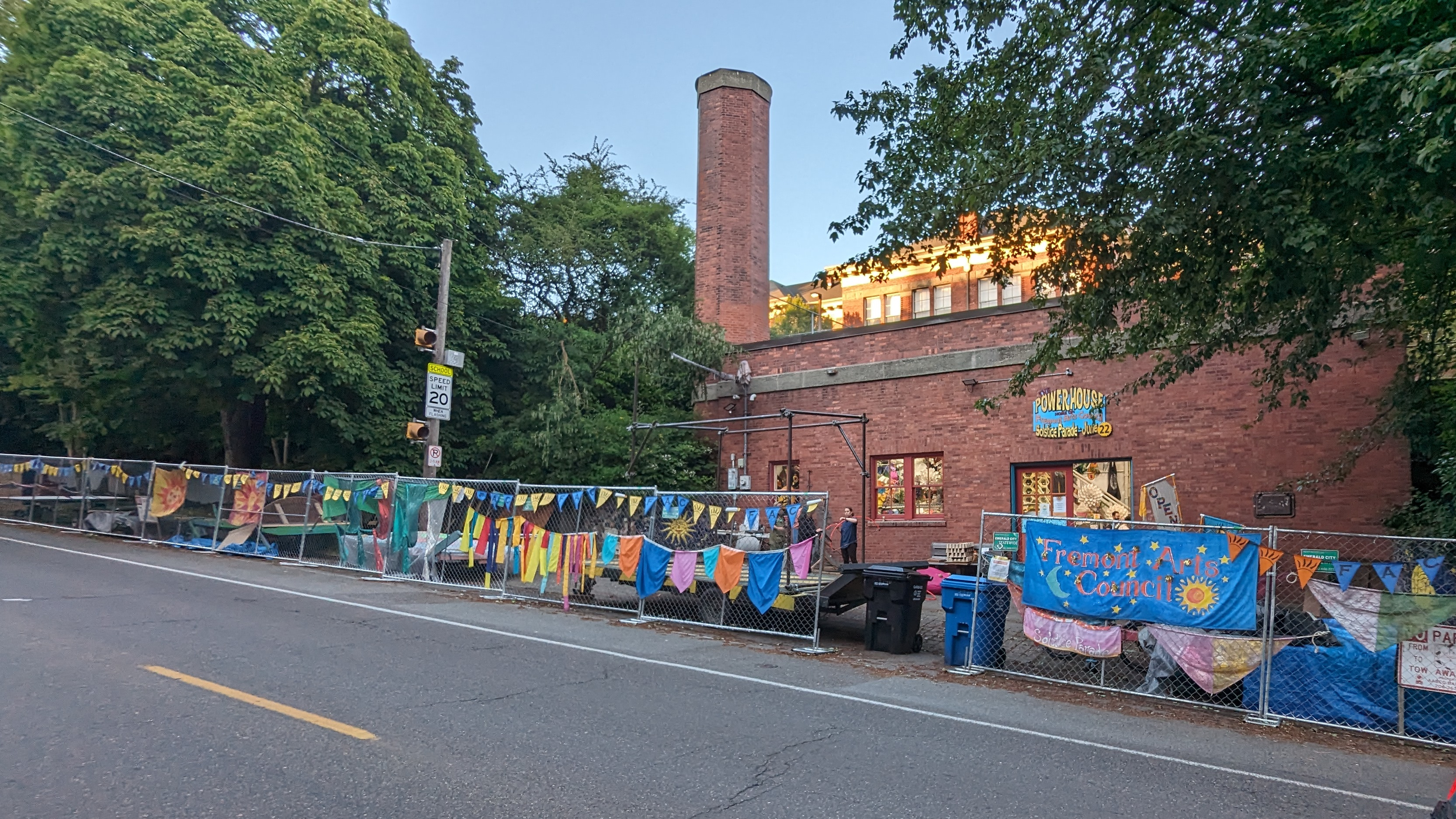
The Powerhouse with Floats being built for the Solstice Parade

The Fremont Arts Council was founded in the Fremont neighborhood of Seattle, Washington, in 1979. Since 1994, the FAC has been headquartered out of The Powerhouse.

== Events ==
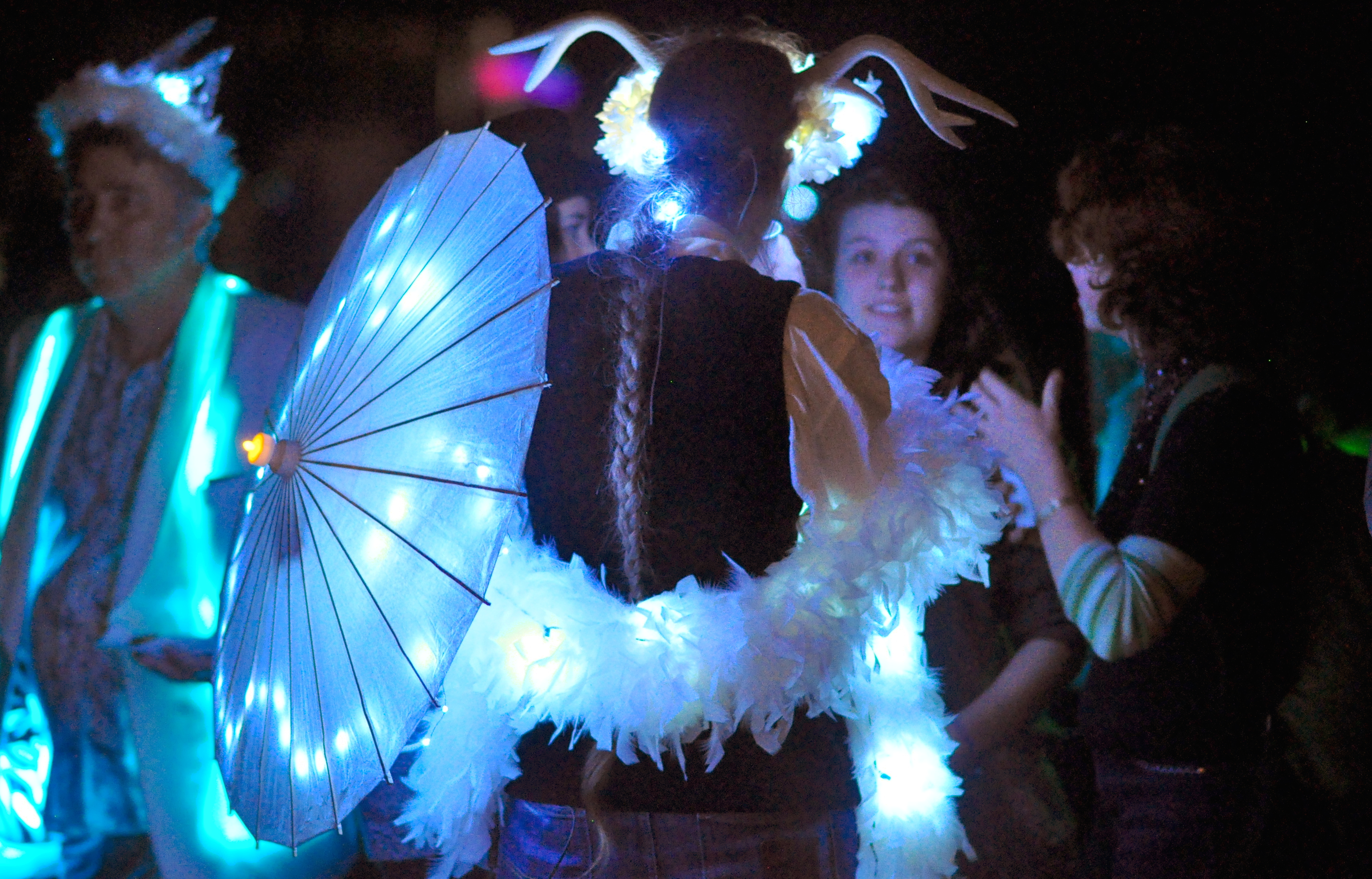
Luminata 2016

The Fremont Arts Council sponsors several annual events including the Summer Solstice Parade and Pageant, May Day, Troll-a-ween, Petit-Troll: Mini Mardis Gras Parade, and Luminata.

The Summer Solstice Parade and Pageant and Luminata are held annually on the Summer Solstice and Autumnal Equinox.

The Council hosts public workshops and organizes classes out of the Powerhouse with a focus on public art. Several local artists teach regular classes on giant puppets, reed luminaries, and textiles

== Public Art ==
FAC has been responsible for the installation and maintenance of several public artworks in the Fremont area. These include the Fremont Troll, Waiting for the Interurban, The Center of the Universe Sign, and several nearby murals.

=== Fremont Troll ===
The Fremont Troll

One of Seattle's most popular public artworks, the Fremont Troll, is a mixed-media megalithic statue, located on N. 36th Street at Troll Avenue N., under the north end of the Aurora Bridge. (Troll Avenue was renamed in its honor in 2005.) It is clutching an actual original Volkswagen Beetle, as if it had just swiped it from the roadway above. In light of Seattle P–I columnist Emmett Watson's periodic promotion of the KBO, the vehicle had a California license plate.

The piece was commissioned by the Fremont Arts Council in 1989, and built in 1990. The Troll was sculpted by four local artists: Steve Badanes, Will Martin, Donna Walter and Ross Whitehead. The Troll is 18 feet (5.5 m) high, weighs seven tons, and is made of steel rebar, wire and ferroconcrete.

=== Waiting for the Interurban ===
"Waiting for the Interurban" is a 1979 cast aluminum sculpture collection by Richard Beyer in the Fremont neighborhood of Seattle. It is located on the south side of N. 34th Street, just east of the northern end of the Fremont Bridge. It consists of six people standing under a shelter and waiting for public transportation—specifically, the Seattle-Everett Interurban.

The sculpture is a few blocks west of Troll Avenue N., the location of the Fremont Troll.

== See also ==
- Bohemianism
- Culture jamming
