= Madrona–Sally Goldmark Branch Library =

Library in Seattle, Washington, U.S.

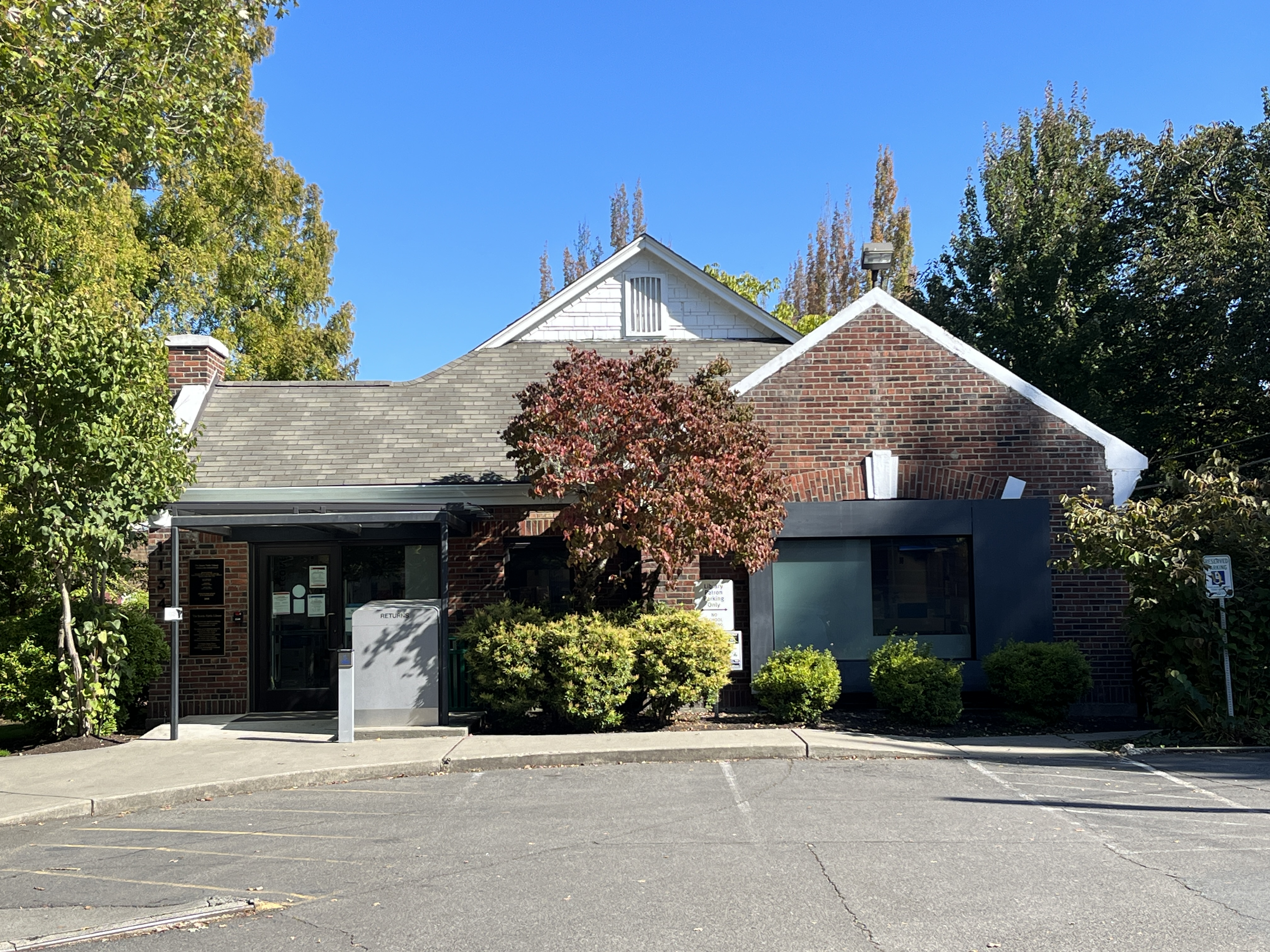
- The library's exterior, 2023
- 47°36′45.7″N 122°17′24.1″W

The Madrona–Sally Goldmark Branch Library (sometimes simply the Madrona Public Library) is a branch of Seattle Public Library, in Seattle, Washington.

Serving the Central District, the library originated from the Book-Tique pilot program, established in 1971. It was renamed to commemorate community leader Sally Goldmark in 1986.

The aluminum sculpture The Peaceable Kingdom by Richard Beyer was installed outside the library in 1984. Among animals depicted in the artwork is a panther, representing the Seattle Black Panthers, who were headquartered in the Madrona neighborhood. According to Brangien Davis of Seattle Magazine, "The panther represents the Black Panthers, the pig portrays the police, the sheep represent the elderly residents, and the wolf symbolizes the street toughs—all living (in an ideal past) peaceably together."

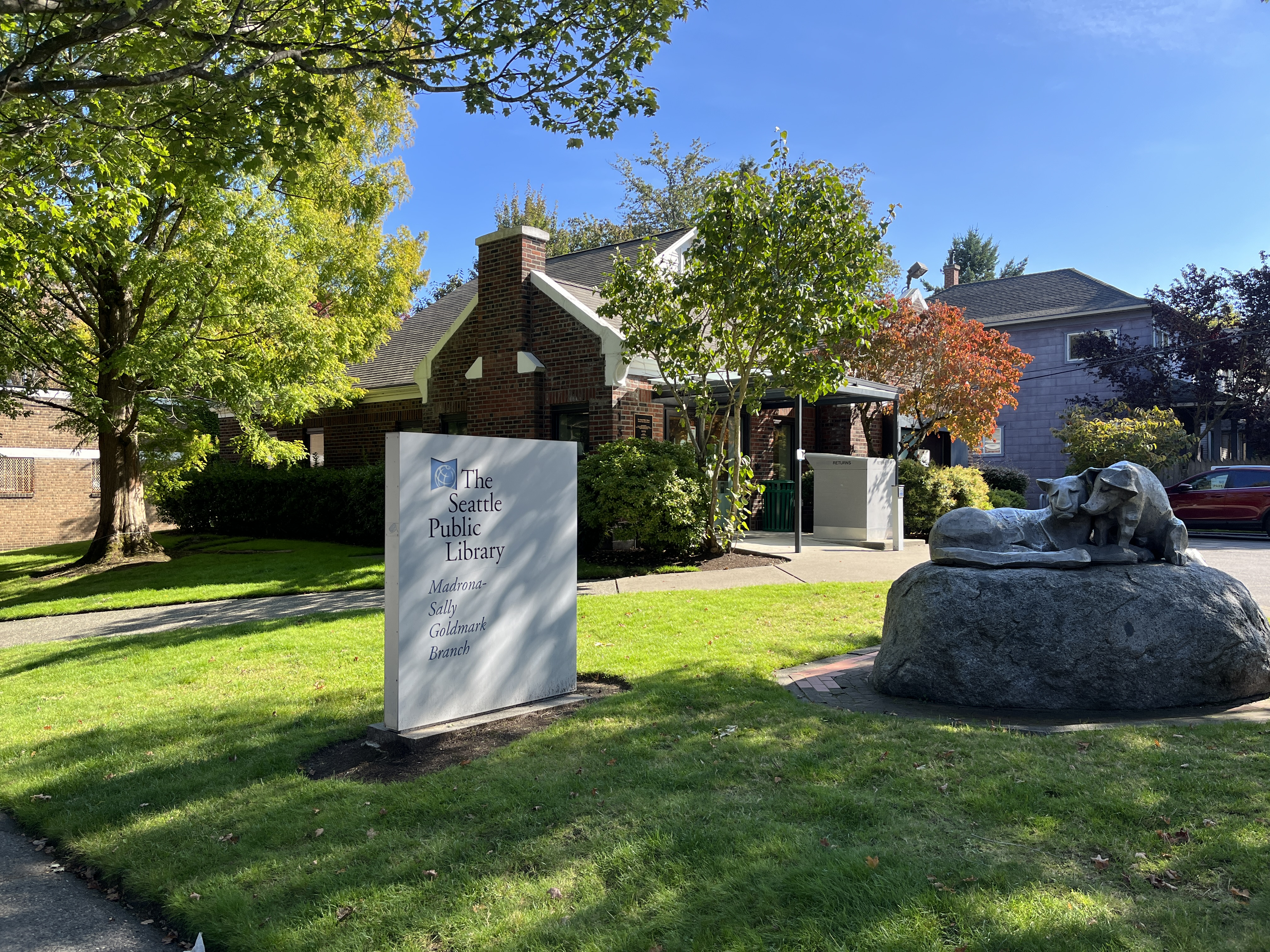
The Peaceable Kingdom by Richard Beyer, installed outside the library

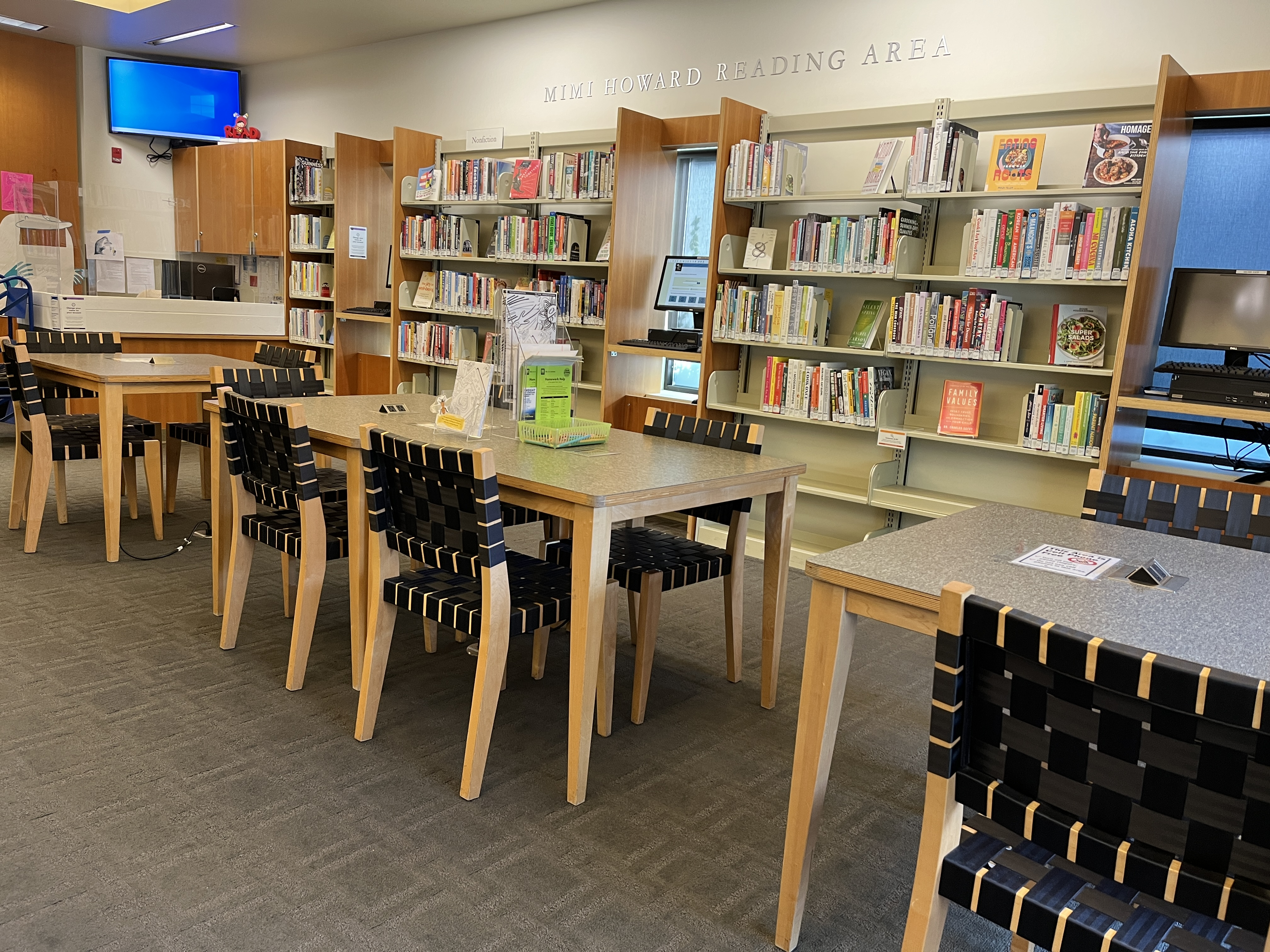
The library's interior, 2023
