= Waiting for the Interurban =

Sculpture by Richard Beyer in Seattle, Washington, U.S.

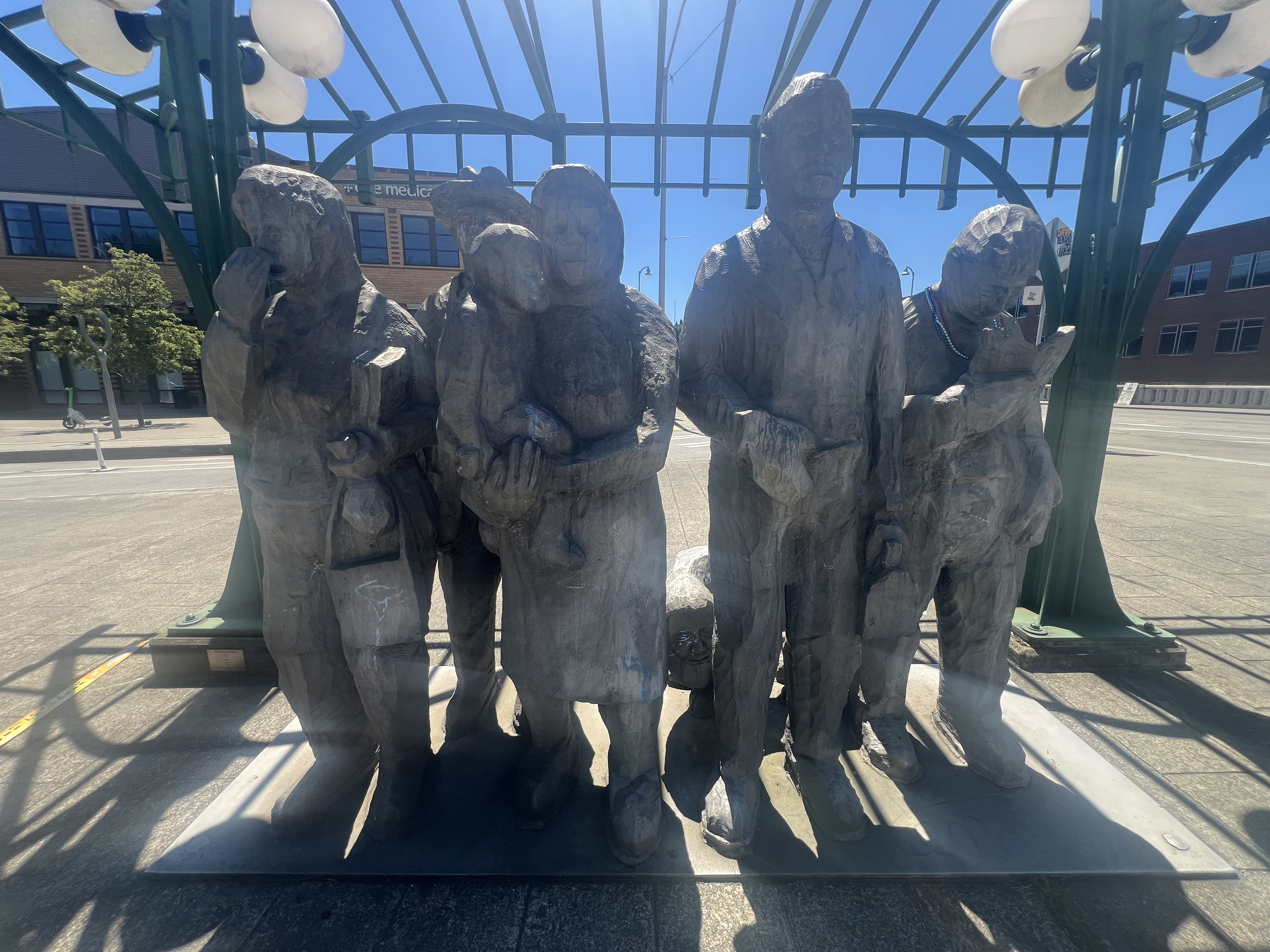
- Waiting for the Interurban, by Richard Beyer.
- Artist: Richard Beyer
- Year: 1978
- Type: Cast aluminum sculpture
- Location: Seattle; 47.649467°N 122.349455°W

Waiting for the Interurban, also known as People Waiting for the Interurban, is a 1978 cast aluminum sculpture collection in the Fremont neighborhood of Seattle. It is located on the southeast corner of N. 34th Street and Fremont Avenue N., just east of the northern end of the Fremont Bridge. It consists of six people and a dog waiting for public transportation — specifically, the Seattle-Everett Interurban. While the interurban railway ran through Fremont from 1910 until 1939, it stopped on Fremont Avenue rather than N. 34th Street, which the statue faces.

The sculptor, Fremont resident Richard Beyer, included several subtleties in the sculpture which reward close viewing. The face of the dog was sculpted to resemble Fremont political leader and the city's "godfather of recycling" Armen "Napoleon" Stephanian, with whom Beyer had public disagreements in the 1970s. People living and working in the Fremont neighborhood often dress the characters in apparel appropriate to a season or local event.

== History ==
The statues were erected on June 15, 1978, and dedicated on June 17 during the Fremont Fair. Concerns over damage to the statues from weather and automobiles led to the installation of a pergola by artist Pete Larsen in 1979. Power, which provided lighting to the pergola, was not installed until almost ten years later.

Sculptor Richard Beyer was selected in 1975 by the Fremont Arts Council to create Waiting for the Interurban, in commemoration of the 100th anniversary of Fremont's founding. The piece cost $18,210 and was financed mainly through private donations and the city's art fund. Beyer initially went uncompensated for his work, until private fundraisers raised enough revenue to cover the $6,000 he was owed. In January 1980, the Seattle City Council formally accepted the sculpture as a donation to the city.

During the repairs of the Fremont Bridge that began in February 2006, the sculpture was moved about 100 metres (330 ft) east of its original location to History House, at the corner of N. 34th Street and Troll Avenue N., which runs up a hill to the Fremont Troll. History House also has exhibits showing some of the most imaginative displays by people who have decorated the statues over the years. The sculpture was returned to its original site following the completion of bridge repairs in May 2007.

On August 17, 2008, another sculpture was dedicated a block away on N. 34th Street, known as Late for the Interurban. The statue, sculpted by Kevin Pettelle of Sultan, Washington, portrays the 1970s Seattle TV clown J. P. Patches and his sidekick Gertrude.

== Reception ==
Andy Rooney included Waiting for the Interurban in a 60 Minutes piece he did criticizing modern art.
