= Cross Kirkland Corridor =

Rail trail in Washington state, USA

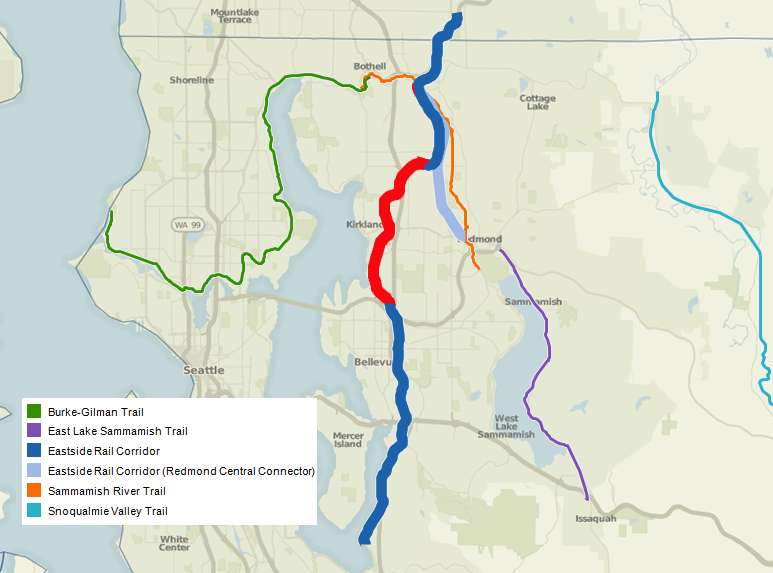
- Cross Kirkland Corridor route in red (Eastside Rail Corridor route in blue)
- Length: 5.75 mi (9.25 km)
- Location: Kirkland, Washington
- Trailheads: near South Kirkland Park and Ride, near Carillon Point, Lake View Elementary/central Houghton, Feriton Spur Park (Google), Sixth St. S., NE 85th St., 7th Avenue (Picadilly), Peter Kirk Elementary/Cotton Hill Park, Crestwoods Park, NE 112th St., Kirkland Justice Center, Totem Lake area (4)
- Use: Hiking/Biking
- Highest point: 200 ft (61 m), Kirkland near Peter Kirk Elem.
- Right of way: Northern Pacific's "Belt Line" and Burlington Northern's Woodinville Subdivision
- Website: www.kirklandwa.gov/Government/Departments/Public-Works-Department/Cross-Kirkland-Corridor

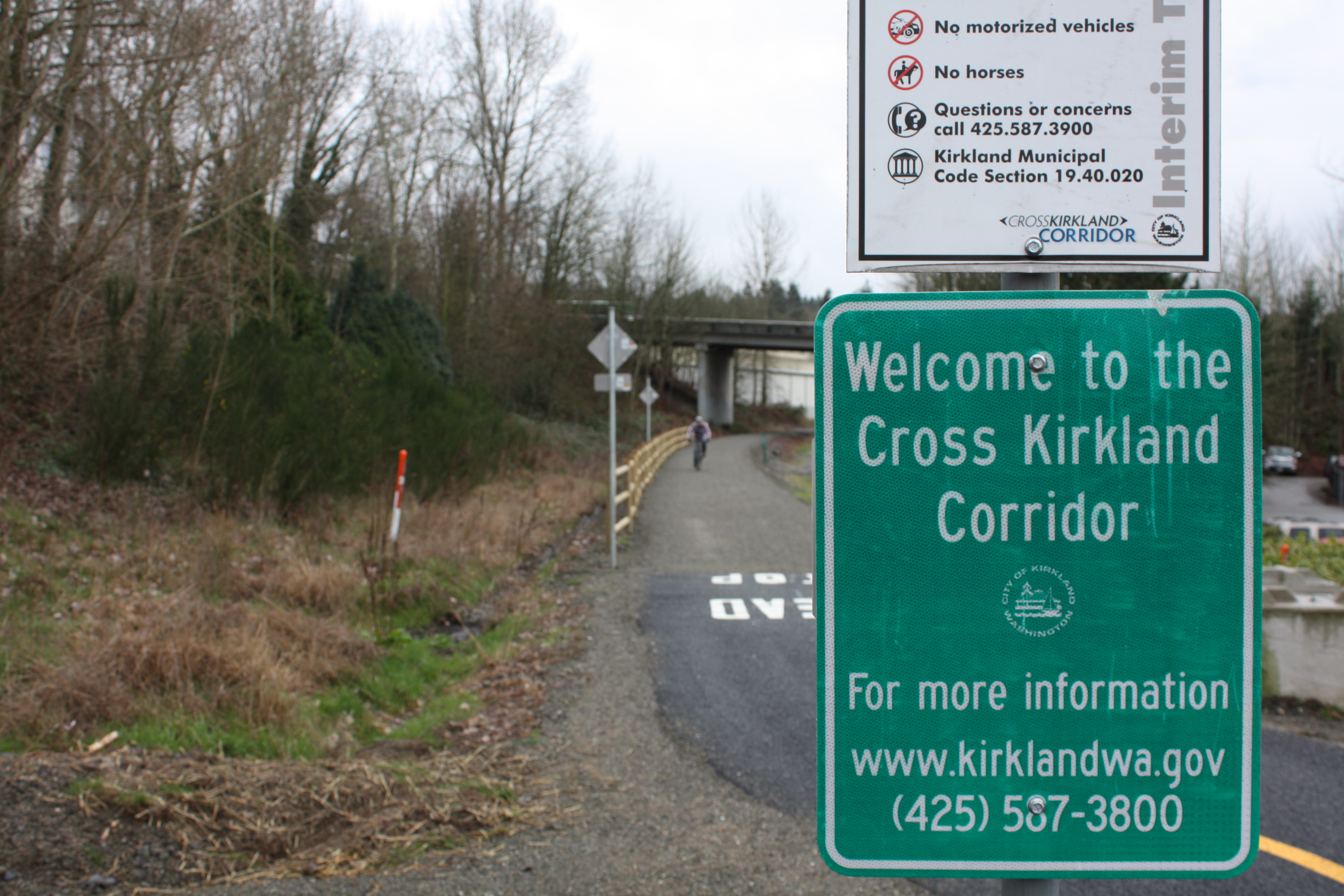

Cross Kirkland Corridor is a 5.75-mile (9.25 km) rail trail and linear park in the city of Kirkland, Washington. It is Kirkland's segment of the multi-city Eastside Rail Corridor on the Eastside Seattle suburbs.

After acquisition, the corridor was approved by the city for future light rail and other transit use.

== Feriton Spur Park ==
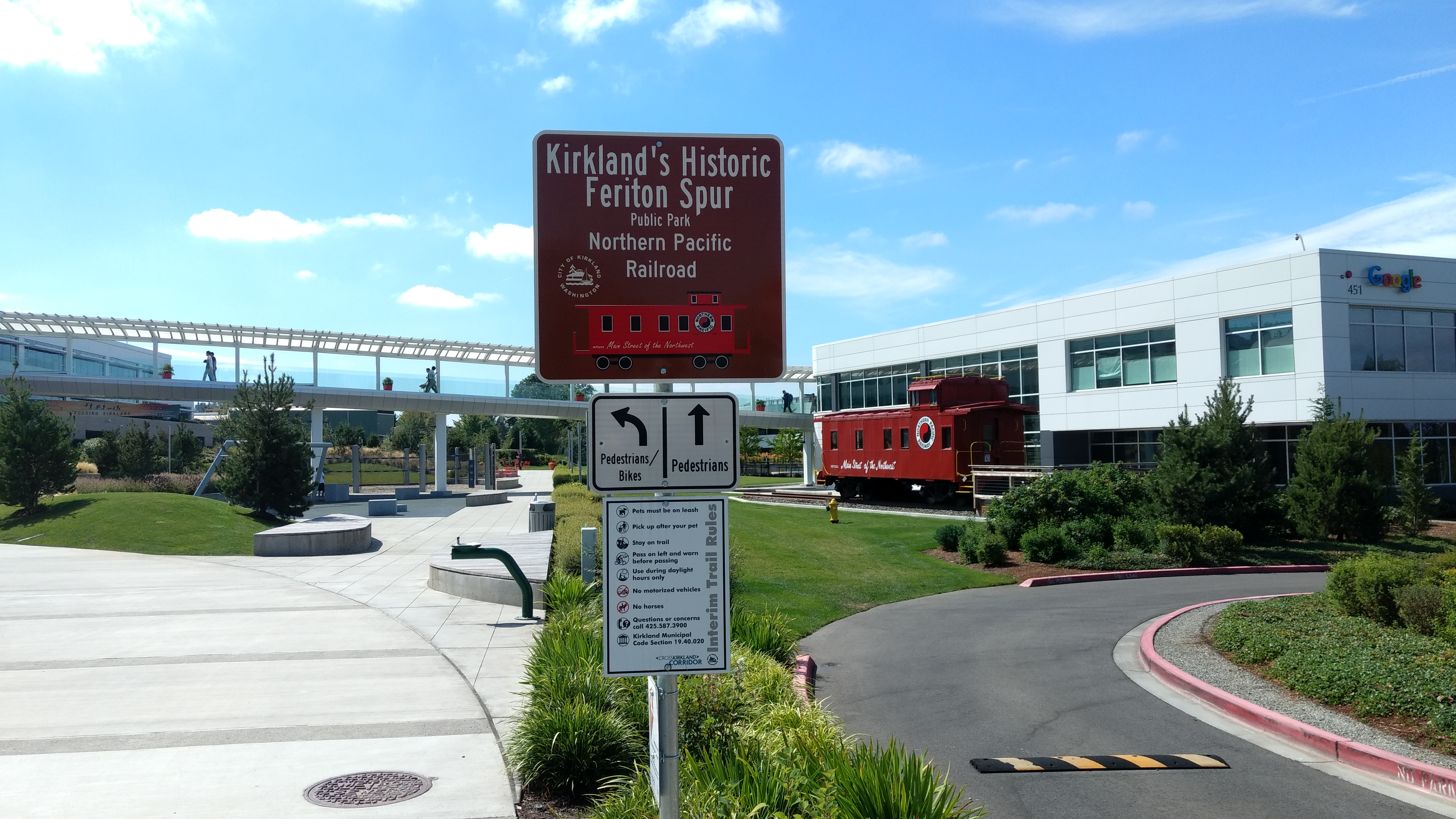
Feriton Spur Park

The city developed Feriton Spur Park (47.6702°N 122.1981°W) approximately halfway between ends of the trail, in public–private partnership with Google, where one of the company's Kirkland campuses surrounds the park.

== Public art ==
Under a city construction budget set-aside for public art in Kirkland, art is installed on the corridor. The first such work was The Spikes, created in 2017 by Lake Washington Institute of Technology welding student Merrily Dicks, and consisting of three 6–8 ft (1.8–2.4 m) columns of recycled railroad spikes, rising from a 4 ft × 4 ft (1.2 m × 1.2 m) metal base.
