= J. P. Patches =

- Logo in 1958
- Also known as: The J. P. Patches Show
- Created by: Chris Wedes
- Starring: Chris Wedes; Bob Newman
- Country of origin: United States
- No. of seasons: 24
- No. of episodes: around 12,000

Original release
- Network: KIRO-TV
- Release: February 10, 1958 – September 25, 1981
- Network: KCTS-TV
- Release: December 14, 2011

Julius Pierpont "J. P." Patches was a clown and the main character on The J. P. Patches Show, an Emmy Award-winning local children's television show on Seattle station KIRO-TV, produced from 1958 to 1981. J.P. Patches was played by show creator and Seattle children's entertainer Chris Wedes (April 3, 1928 – July 22, 2012). When the show ended in 1981, The J. P. Patches Show was one of the longest-running locally produced children's television programs in the United States.

Gertrude (left) and J.P. Patches in 2008.

== The J. P. Patches Show ==
The J. P. Patches Show was on TV for a total of 23 years. For the first thirteen years it was on six days a week, twice per day on weekdays (before and after school) plus Saturday mornings from Monday, February 10, 1958, through Saturday, December 26, 1970. For the next eight years, the show aired mornings only, six days a week, Monday, December 28, 1970, through Saturday, December 30, 1978. For the final two years, the show ran exclusively on Saturday mornings, January 6, 1979 through September 19, 1981. The following week, five special episodes, retrospectives and farewells, ran from Monday, September 21 through Friday, September 25, 1981—and then it was over. The J.P. Patches Show broadcast an estimated 12,000 episodes—almost all of them totally live and unrehearsed .

The show premiered on February 10, 1958, on KIRO-TV. The show was immensely popular in the Puget Sound area and southwestern British Columbia; at the peak of its run, the program had a daily local viewership of over 100,000. It was enjoyed not only by children but also their parents, who appreciated J. P.'s frequent use of double entendre (G-rated) and sly subversiveness that mostly went over the kids' heads. Two generations of Pacific Northwest viewers grew up as "Patches Pals", sharing the joyful zany antics of J.P. with their kids. Patches Pals were reminded every show to follow the Patches Pals daily checklist:

- Mind Mommy and Daddy
- Wash hands, face, neck, and ears
- Comb hair
- Brush Teeth
- Drink your milk
- Eat all of your food
- Say your prayers
- Share your toys
- Put toys away
- Hang up clothes

The J. P. Patches Show competed with two other local children's shows, Captain Puget on KOMO-TV, and Wunda Wunda and King's Klubhouse, both on KING-TV. Captain Kangaroo, CBS's own long-running children's show, saw its first half-hour preempted by KIRO-TV in favor of J.P. Patches.

After 23 years, KIRO-TV cancelled the show because of declining ratings, and the final episode was broadcast on September 25, 1981. After the show ended, Wedes continued to portray J.P. at many public and private charity events for another thirty years despite suffering in later years from incurable (but in remission) blood cancer. Wedes spent many hours visiting sick children at Seattle Children's Hospital in Laurelhurst, never asking to be paid. In 2011, due to declining health, Wedes announced that his final public appearance as J. P. would be on September 17, 2011, fifty-six years after first donning the face paint. On December 14, 2011, a prime time special was aired on KCTS-TV titled J. P. Patches: Last Night at the City Dump, which was meant to serve as a farewell to the character. On July 22, 2012, at 84 years of age, Chris Wedes died after a long battle with multiple myeloma, a form of blood cancer.

=== Premise ===
The show was live, unrehearsed improv with rarely more than two live actors on the set (Wedes and Bob Newman), but with frequent contributions from the sound effects man and off-camera crew. J. P. was the "Mayor of the City Dump", where he lived in a shack, the inside of which was the appropriately rough but colorfully-furnished studio set. He welcomed frequent guests: Seattle boy scout and girl scout troops, various local and national celebrities (see below), and his cast of supporting characters: Sturdley the Bookworm (a puppet), Esmerelda (portrayed by a Raggedy Ann doll), Ketchikan the Animal Man (a sort of Jack Hanna character), Boris S. Wort (the "second meanest man in the world"), LeRoy Frump (a character obviously based on Art Carney's Ed Norton), Tikey Turkey (a rubber chicken), Grandpa Tick Tock (a grandfather clock with an elderly face where the pendulum would be), The Swami of Pastrami, Ggoorrsstt the Friendly Frpl (a one-eyed brown shag carpet), Miss Smith (a motorcycle riding delivery woman who told mostly awful jokes), Superclown (a JP like superhero), J. P.'s evil counterpart P. J. Scratches (per official site I.M. Rags), and J. P.'s girlfriend, Gertrude. The show's entire supporting cast, male and female, human or non-human, was mostly played by the versatile actor Bob Newman.

=== Bob Newman ===
Bob Newman (born January 24, 1932, on Mercer Island, Washington) initially started at KIRO-TV as a film-editor and floor director in 1960, two years into J.P.'s run. He used to hang around the set, just to watch the fun. One of J. P.'s bits was to call the city dump telephone operator Gertrude on a big yellow banana phone, although Gertrude herself was never seen or heard. One day, after J. P. asked Gertrude for a ham sandwich for a picnic, Newman yelled out, in a falsetto voice, "Okay Julius, I'll send it right down." Wedes was as surprised as everyone else, and from that day forward Newman became Gertrude, with his falsetto voice, frumpy dress and a wig made from a mop dyed red. J. P. got his "ham sandwich," as Bob Newman was willing to do anything for a laugh and proved to be the perfect foil for Wedes' improvisational comedy. He provided over 17 characters for the show and remained a faithful friend to Chris Wedes for the rest of his life. Newman died on December 13, 2020.

=== ICU2TV ===
J. P. announced the birthdays of selected Patches Pals by "viewing" them on his "ICU2TV," a cardboard hood that created the illusion that J. P. was looking at you from inside your television. He predicted where a gift might be hidden in the child's house with amazing accuracy (with the never-mentioned assistance of a postcard from a parent). The sound effect used was the same, distinctive ringtone of Lloyd Cramden's "presidential hotline" telephone in Our Man Flint.

=== Famous guests on the show ===
- Steve Allen and Jayne Meadows
- Al Capp
- Jacques Cousteau
- Beverly Garland (of My Three Sons)
- The Harlem Globetrotters
- Jack LaLanne
- Clayton Moore
- Jesse Owens
- Slim Pickens
- Dixy Lee Ray
- Debbie Reynolds
- Merrilee Rush
- Colonel Harland Sanders
- Danny Thomas
- Tiny Tim
- Burt Ward

== Origin ==
Broadcaster Daryl Laub created the J. P. Patches character in 1953 for WTCN-TV in Minneapolis. When he left WTCN in 1955 for KSTP-TV, Chris Wedes (pronounced WEE-dus) took over the character from that point on. Wedes appeared on several WTCN programs. Besides J.P., his most notable character was Joe the Cook, a sidekick to host Roger Awsumb as Case Jones on WTCN's Lunch with Casey. Wedes brought J. P. with him when he moved to Seattle in 1958 to become KIRO-TV's first floor director. In addition to the long-running TV show, J. P. Patches made frequent fundraising appearances for local charities. He was a common sight at Children's Hospital, visiting sick kids and promoting the work of the hospital.

== Late for the Interurban statue ==
Late for the Interurban sculpture

On August 17, 2008, a bronze statue of J. P. and Gertrude was unveiled on North 34th Street, about 250 feet east of the intersection with Fremont Avenue North, in the Fremont section of Seattle. The unveiling date was to celebrate the 50th anniversary of the J. P. Patches show. The statue is called Late for the Interurban by sculptor Kevin Pettelle and is approximately 250 feet (76 m) east of Waiting for the Interurban. The unveiling was attended by hundreds of Patches' Pals, including Washington Governor Christine Gregoire, Congressman Jim McDermott, King County Executive Ron Sims, and several members of the county and city councils; both Chris Wedes (J. P. Patches) and Bob Newman (Gertrude) were present. The event was emceed by Pat Cashman, and the keynote address was given by Wedes' 16-year-old granddaughter, Christina Frost.

== Merchandise and Videos ==
- A J. P. Patches action figure is distributed by Seattle novelty dealer Archie McPhee, along with a bobblehead, lunchboxes, Christmas ornaments and assorted other collectibles.
- In 1992, four VHS video tapes were released of the J. P. Patches Show. Because the show was performed and broadcast live—in real time—very, very little footage of the show was ever made. There is a Christmas show, there is a highlights reel, there is a 20th anniversary show put together in 1978, and there is J. P.'s final show in 1981. All of the above footage was incorporated into a 2-DVD set in 2005.
- The book J.P. Patches, Northwest Icon, by Bryan Johnston and Julius Pierpont Patches (Chris Wedes), (ISBN 0897167996) was released in 2002 by Peanut Butter Publishing.
- Johnston has also written a novel about Boris S. Wort and his campaign to "meanify" Seattle, entitled The 2nd Meanest Man in the World (2017). Seattleites "of a certain age" will find many icons and events of their childhood put into the perspective of Wort's nefarious plot.
- In addition to the book and action figure, DVDs and tee shirts have been available at the Channel 9 store.
- In 2025 Washington State specialty license plates became available with J.P. and Gertrude's picture on them.

== Popular culture ==
- J. P. was listed as one of Krusty the Clown's birthday buddies in the animated television show The Simpsons (episode "Radio Bart") along with Bart. This was similar to JP's I.C.U.2-TV segment. Matt Groening, the creator, drew a lot of inspiration from his former home in the Pacific Northwest such as naming the streets. JP and fellow Pacific NW clown Rusty Nails are considered the inspiration for Krusty.

== See also ==
- Fremont Troll
- List of local children's television series (United States)

== Video ==
- Wedes, Chris (performer, author); Newman, Bob (performer, author); Towey, Joe (director); in association with KIRO Television (1993). J.P. Patches. [Vol. 4, J.P's magic house] (VHS). Seattle: City Dump Productions. B&W with color sequences, remaster of rescued original recordings c. 1960s - early 1970s.
- Wedes, Chris (performer, author); Newman, Bob (performer, author); "a cast of thousands"; Towey, Joe (director in association with KIRO Television, author); Jones, Rich (director in association with KIRO Television, author) (1992). The J.P. Patches Show. [Vol. 1, Gertrude reveals Superklown] (VHS). Seattle: City Dump Productions. Remaster of rescued original recordings c. 1970s.

== Bibliography ==
- Beck, Dave (2001-01-04). "J.P. Patches and Gertrude". Weekday. KUOW-FM. Archived from the original on 2007-09-28.
  Link to RealAudio archive of interview on local morning program on KUOW-FM 94.6, Seattle.
  Host talks with local Seattle stars from the J.P. Patches Show, 54m 56s.
  RealAudio link: "http://128.208.34.90/ramgen/archive/weekday/wkdy010104-b.rm?start='00:01:59.000'&end='00:56:05.048'"
- Center for Urban Horticulture (1999). "History @ UBNA". Union Bay Natural Area. Departments, University of Washington. Archived from the original on 2006-05-17. Date per "Montlake Landfill Information SumMarchy, January 1999".
- "Character name search". Internet Movie Database.
- J.P. Patches.com.Co.Inc.Ltd.International (1647) [sic]. "J.P.'s Appearances" [sic]". JPPatches. Archived from the original on 2006-03-23.
- J.P. Patches.com.Co.Inc.Ltd.International (1647) [sic]. "Patches Pal News". JPPatches. Archived from the original on 2006-04-09.
  2006 appearances, inclusive.
- Johnston, Bryan; Wedes, Chris (2002). Hobson, Tom (ed.). J.P. Patches, Northwest icon. Seattle: Peanut Butter Publishers. ISBN 0-89716-799-6.
  Chris Wedes holds the copyright, Bryan Johnston is the author.
- JPPatches (2005). "J.P. Patches". Home > Pacific Northwest Shop > J.P. Patches. Channel 9 Corporation. Archived from the original on 2006-03-23.
- Paynter, Susan (2006-02-17). "This clown truly deserves a statue". Seattle Post-intelligencer.
- Phelps, Myra L. (1978). Public works in Seattle. Seattle: Seattle Engineering Department. ISBN 0-9601928-1-6.
- Stein, Alan J. (2003-03-02). "Patches, Julius Pierpont". HistoryLink.org Essay 5344.

Stein referenced Jack Broom, "The J.P. Generation", Pacific Magazine, The Seattle Times, 4 April 1993, pp. 6-11,14-17;
Bill Cartmel, "Hi Ya, Patches Pals", Seattle Post-Intelligencer, 11 April 1971, pp. 6-7;
Erik Lacitis, "Patches Understands – and Survives", The Seattle Times, 23 February 1978, p. A15;
[no title], The East Side Journal, 31 May 1962, p. 3; Ibid. 14 May 1969, p. 19.

- Beck, Dave (2001-01-04). "J.P. Patches and Gertrude". Weekday. KUOW-FM. Archived from the original on 2007-09-28.
- "J.P. Patches". home page.
