= Buoy (mascot) =

Ice hockey team mascot

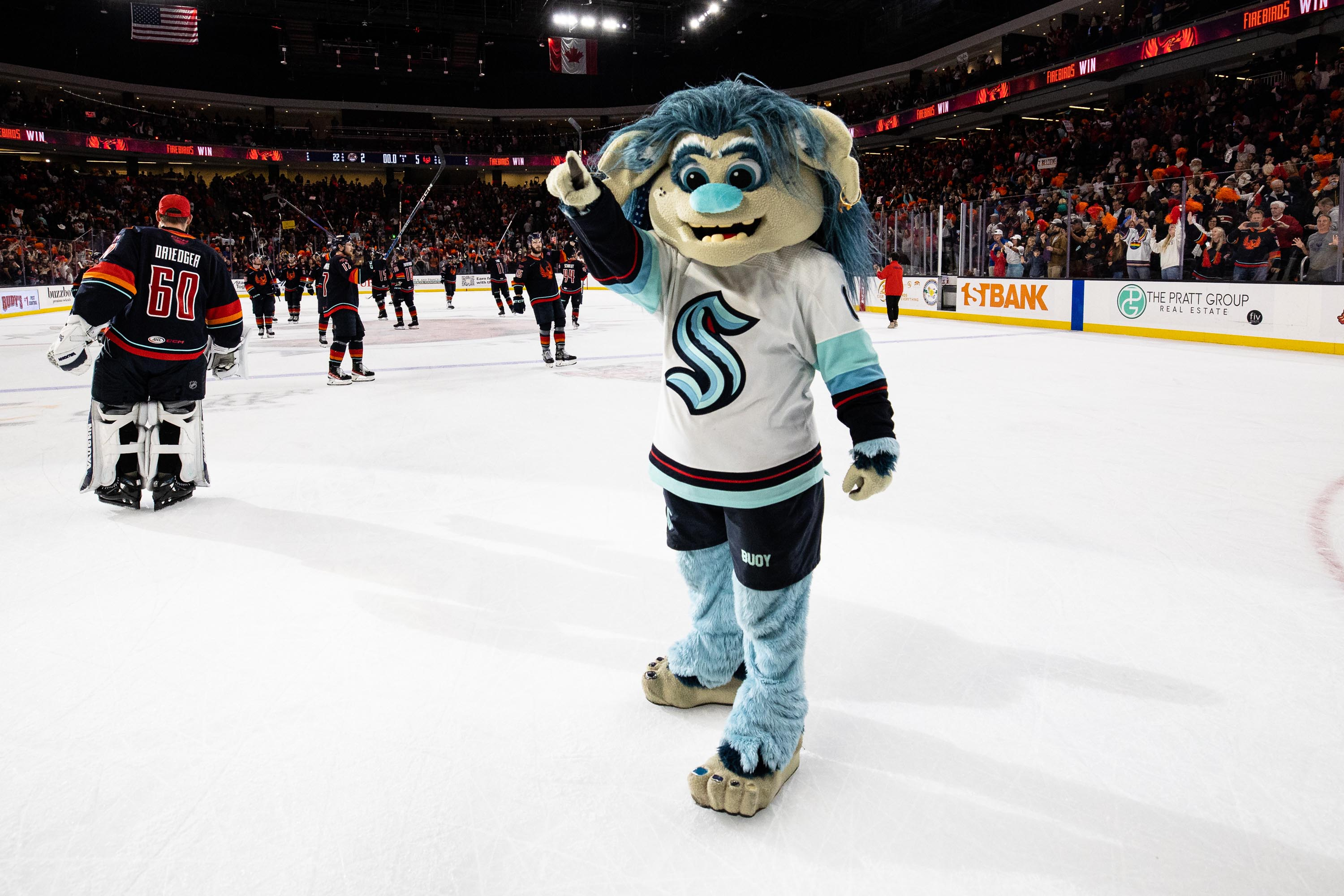
- Buoy at the 2023 Calder Cup finals
- Team: Seattle Kraken
- Description: Sea troll
- First seen: October 1, 2022
- Website: www.nhl.com/kraken/fans/team-mascot-buoy

Buoy is the official mascot for the Seattle Kraken, a National Hockey League (NHL) team based in Seattle.

== History ==
The process of finding a mascot took two years, starting around the time the team unveiled their name in July 2020. Because a kraken is a mythical being whose complete appearance is unknown, the team chose not to use it as a mascot. The team also opted not to have an octopus mascot, to avoid redundancy with Al the Octopus, mascot of the Detroit Red Wings.

In December 2021, the Kraken announced a non-fungible token (NFT) sale; 32 tokens allowed their owners to see "mysterious hints of the Kraken mascot", with the expectation that the NFT would show the complete mascot upon the official announcement. Critics said that the promotion conflicted with the team's sustainability goals, due to the high energy costs associated with NFTs.

During the 2021–22 season, in the absence of an official mascot, the Kraken promoted a "team dog" named Davy Jones. The dog, a four-month-old husky mix rescue dog introduced on January 17, 2022, socialized with fans at home games as he trained to be a therapy dog. In August 2023, the Seattle Times reported that Davy Jones displayed signs of anxiety at games and did not make appearances at Kraken games in the team’s second season as a result.

The Kraken introduced Buoy on October 1, 2022, prior to a preseason game at Climate Pledge Arena against the Vancouver Canucks. The Kraken had intended to introduce Buoy around Christmas during the 2021–22 season, but due to game postponements related to the spread of the SARS-CoV-2 Omicron variant, the team decided to wait until prior to the 2022–23 season instead.

On June 25, 2025, a promotional film shoot to promote youth hockey featuring Buoy and Kraken forward John Hayden was interrupted when a grizzly bear aggressively approached the group while they fly fished in Alaska's Katmai National Park and Preserve. The group waded away from the bear as it approached before the bear eventually turned around.

== Description ==
Buoy, said to be a nephew of the Fremont Troll, is a 6-foot (1.8 m) tall blue sea troll. His hair is "a nod to hockey flow and the waves of Puget Sound," said Lamont Buford, the Kraken's vice president of entertainment experience and production. He has a removable front tooth, a squeaky aqua-blue nose, an earring and tattoo in his rump each depicting an anchor (representing the team's alternate logo), freckles, and a "mysterious tentacle indicating an encounter with the Kraken". He has made regular appearances at Kraken home games with Red Alert, the team's marching band, and navigates around the arena's concourses using elevators and a motorized hoverboard.

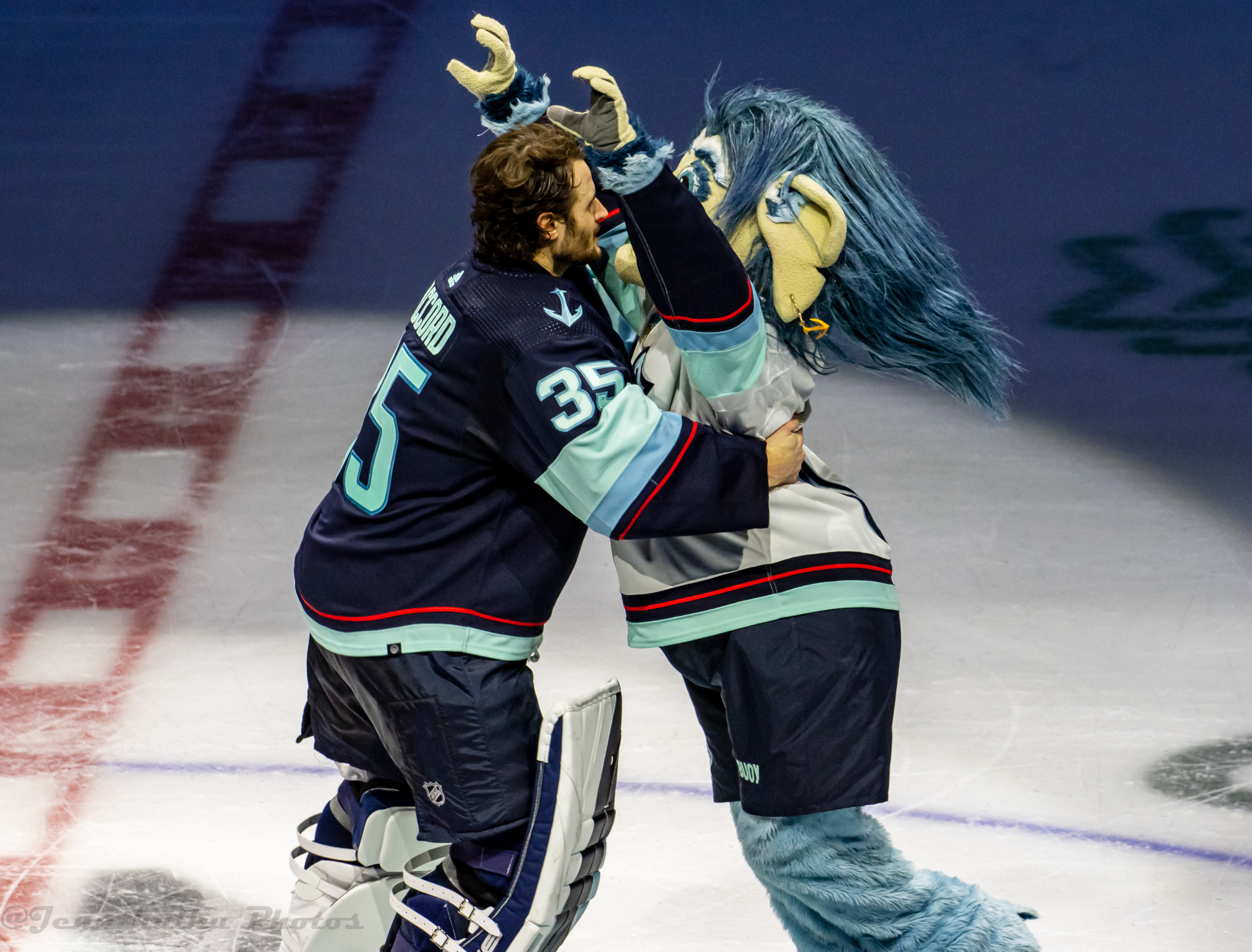
Kraken goaltender Joey Daccord hugging Buoy after a game in 2023.

The mascot maintains an active presence on Twitter; after some Twitter users responded sarcastically or negatively to his introduction, Buoy trolled these users with dismissive or sarcastic responses of his own. Gritty, the Philadelphia Flyers mascot, and Chance, the Vegas Golden Knights mascot, tweeted messages of solidarity with Buoy upon his debut.

== Reaction ==
Reaction to Buoy's debut was polarized, with many observers expressing a strong like or dislike for the mascot. A reporter for KUOW called negative attention to the criticism of Buoy by adults, noting that the mascot is targeted at children. Halfway through the 2022–23 NHL season, ESPN's Greg Wyshynski called Buoy the worst Seattle Kraken development of the season so far, describing the mascot as "a land-based troll doll with Brian Burke's hairstyle." In late December 2022, however, two The Seattle Times reporters wrote that Buoy "appears to be a hit" with younger Kraken fans.

Buoy, since his introduction, has been in a professional wrestling-style feud with Paul Bissonnette. On his Spittin' Chiclets podcast in 2022, Bissonnette called Buoy "the ugliest mascot of all time". The commentator and the mascot traded insults on X in the days before the 2024 NHL Winter Classic, held in Seattle. During an intermission report at the Winter Classic, Buoy confronted Bissonnette wearing a pair of large boxing gloves; Bissonette responded by throwing his microphone at Buoy, after which Buoy pursued Bissonnette with a "Kick Me" sign. Bissonnette knocked the mascot down with a high shoulder, following up with an elbow drop.
