= History House of Greater Seattle =

- Established: 1998
- Location: 900 N. 34th St. Seattle, Washington
- Coordinates: 47°38′58″N 122°20′51″W
- Type: Local history
- Website: www.historyhouse.org

Founded in 1998, the History House of Greater Seattle is a historical museum dedicated to the history and heritage of Seattle and its neighborhoods.

History House of Greater Seattle is a 501 (c) 3 non-profit organization. It is supported by foundations, grants from the City of Seattle and King County, and tax-deductible donations from the public.

The History House is a member of the Association of King County Historical Organizations (AKCHO).

History House moved to a new location in 2017 at 3400 Stone Way N. in the Fremont neighborhood.

== History ==
The museum opened in September 1998 and was founded by Suzie Burke, "The Land Baroness of Fremont," with the purpose to celebrate Seattle's neighborhoods. The stories and photographs of her mother, Florence Burke, were the centerpiece of the museum when it first opened.

== Mission ==
The mission of the History House is "to seek out and empower individuals and groups to display the history, heritage and art of Greater Seattle's diverse neighborhoods."

The museum offers each unique Seattle neighborhood an opportunity to showcase its evolution from small towns into distinct community cultures, and how the neighborhoods contributed to the development of Seattle.

== Exhibits ==
The History House gives "every neighborhood a place to tell their story." The museum spotlights one to two geographical regions of the city each year. Residents of those neighborhoods are encouraged to tell "YOUR story YOUR way" as a contribution to the exhibit.

Unlike traditional exhibits put together by curators, the History House lets residents define their neighborhood's history and evolution.

History House representatives are available to help guide community members through the process of telling that story. The museum also provides a participant's packet that includes ideas, information and possible resources to be used when creating their display.

May 2009 Exhibits
Exhibits include pictorial histories of the Fremont, Wallingford, Georgetown, Madison Park, Queen Anne and Ballard neighborhoods.

The museum is also featuring the histories of the Woodland Park Zoo, the Great Northern Railway, and the B. F. Day Elementary School.

A special exhibit, created in collaboration with the U.S. Army Corps of Engineers, presents a step-by-step pictorial history of the construction of the Hiram M. Chittenden Locks in Ballard.

Past exhibits
34 Unique Museums of King County (2007): an exhibit designed to introduce visitors to 34 unique King County museums.

Late for the Interurban (2008): The History House organized a celebration of local legend J.P. Patches with the unveiling of a new statue honoring J.P and his girlfriend Gertrude in Seattle's Fremont neighborhood. The bronze statue is called "Late for the Interurban" by sculptor Kevin Pettelle and features J.P. Patches (Chris Wedes) and Gertrude (Bob Newman). The statue is located in Solstice Plaza (N 34th Street just east of the Fremont Bridge).

Strength and Stamina: Women of the Seattle Fire Department (2009): "The story of the courage, hard work, and perseverance it took for women to enter the all-male world of firefighting in Seattle." There is a companion online exhibit on the Seattle Municipal Archives website.

== Other Community Projects ==
Seattle High School Senior Project

All Washington state high school students are required complete a senior project as a requirement for graduation. The project generally involves creating and completing some sort of project, usually related to the community.

In 2001, the History House created a pilot program that involves researching, verifying and creating a display that reflects an aspect of the history of a Seattle neighborhood.

Students have completed projects that have shed light on the Native American experience, covered the settlement of neighborhoods by pioneers, economic and social development of neighborhoods and specific neighborhood contributions to the larger Seattle community.

Some projects have been put on permanent display in banks, fire houses, libraries and high schools.

== Organizational structure ==
The Board of Directors currently has 23 members and is headed by museum founder Suzie Burke. Board members are closely involved in the day-to-day operations of the museum. Members share responsibilities such as coordinating student field trips to the museum, concerts and other museum activities and events.

== Resources & Events ==
Neighborhood Community Focus - featuring ideas, information and tools for community history research
Reference Library on Seattle history
History House Magazine
Exhibit Gallery with a wall mural depicting 100 years of Seattle history
Photographic Displays
Video Displays - offering a historical look at the city and featuring clips from local TV pioneers, such as clown J.P. Patches.
Gift Shop - featuring historical books and tapes of Seattle's neighborhoods as well as artwork and handicrafts of community artisans
Sculpture Garden - includes an original 6 foot x 12 foot chunk of The Berlin Wall, a fire engine that was destined for Georgia in the former satellite state of the Soviet Union, "Willy," a 15-foot model orca whale and "The Safe," discovered beneath Fremont's Dubliner Tavern.
Community Meeting Space - Meetings are regularly held at the museum by the Fremont Neighborhood Council and the Fremont Chamber of Commerce.

Summer Concert Series every Sunday at 2 pm, June - July, free to the public. Performances range from "original to traditional folk to new age to maritime chanteys to logging to Celtic and Irish to international to blues to ragtime to jug to bluegrass to just plain zany."
Family Day

== See also ==
- List of museums in Washington (state)
