= Madrona, Seattle =

- Seattle Neighborhood
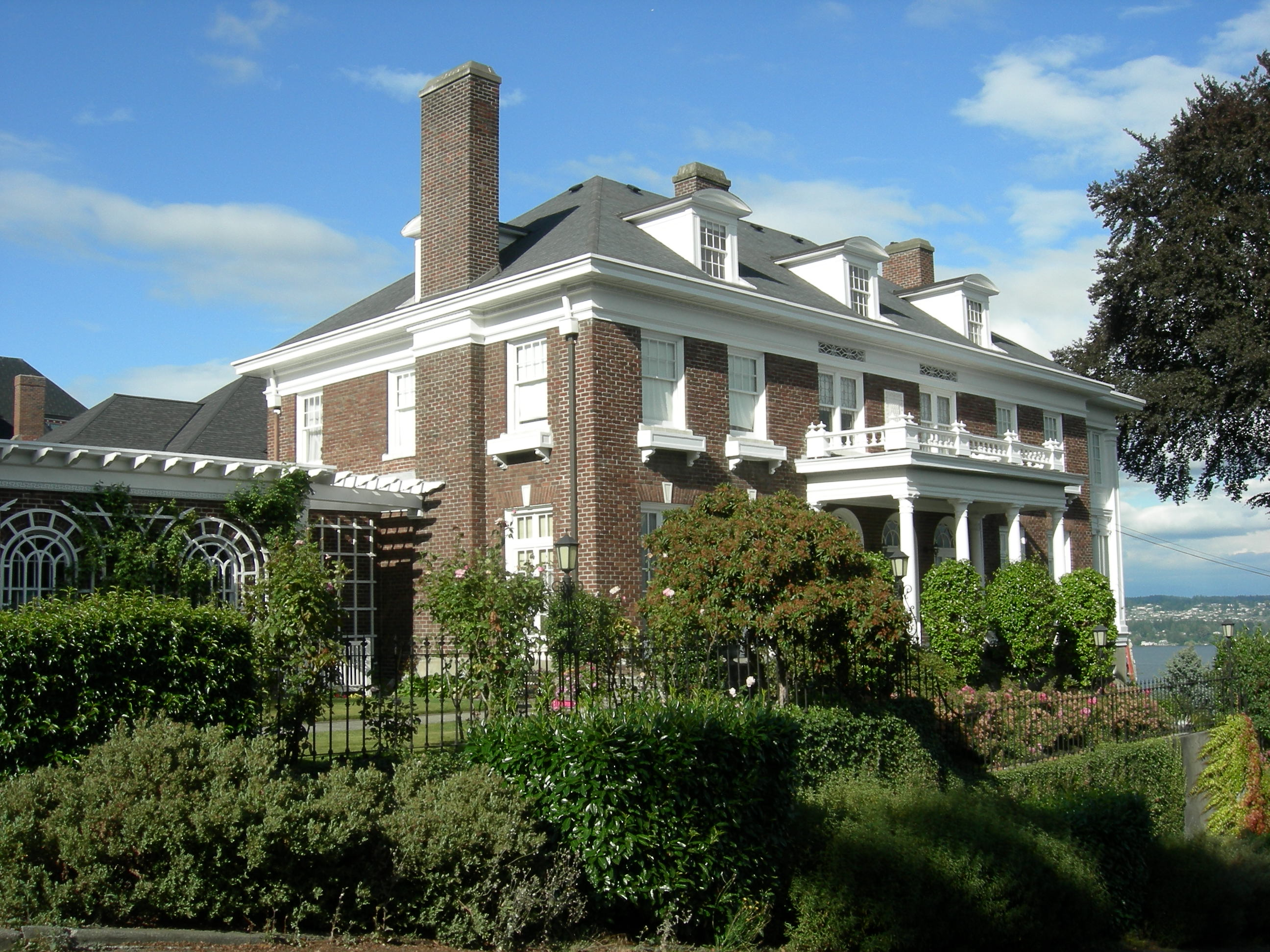
- The Raymond-Ogden Mansion in Madrona (built 1913) is listed on the National Register of Historic Places.

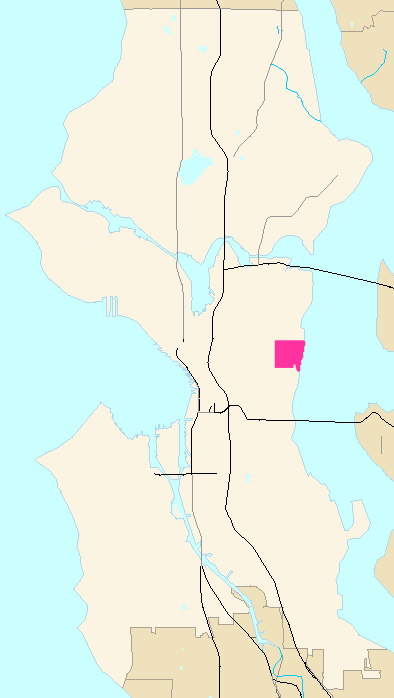
- Madrona Highlighted in Pink
- Coordinates: 47°36′49″N 122°17′19″W
- Country: United States
- State: Washington
- County: King
- City: Seattle
- ZIP Code: 98122
- Area code: 206, 564
- Website: madrona.us

Madrona is a mostly residential neighborhood in east Seattle, Washington. It is bounded on the east by Lake Washington; on the south by E. Cherry Street, beyond which is Leschi; on the west by Martin Luther King Jr. Way, beyond which is the Central District; and on the north by E. Howell Street, beyond which is Denny-Blaine.

The neighborhood's main thoroughfares are E. Union and E. Cherry Streets (east- and westbound), Madrona Drive (northwest- and southeast-bound), and 34th Avenue and Lake Washington Boulevard (north- and southbound). It is home to Madrona Park and the 34th Avenue and E. Union commercial area.

== History ==
The neighborhood was named by John Ayer, who contributed the land for Madrona Park, after a species of tree (Arbutus) common to the area.

Madrona's motto, "The Peaceable Kingdom," reflects its racially mixed heritage. In the early 20th century, the coal mining industry brought Chinese immigrants to Madrona. Later, the shipbuilding boom brought an influx of African Americans. For most of the second half of the 20th century, 34th Avenue divided the neighborhood between mostly middle-class African American (to the west) and upper-class Caucasian (to the east). The Black Panthers used the Madrona Playfield on Spring Street and 34th Avenue as its marching drill location in Seattle.

In more recent years, as the neighborhood has gentrified, Madrona has seen a steady decline in its Black population. The 2018 American Community Survey 5-Year Estimates notes that, of the 5,675 residents in King County Census Tract 78 (covering Madrona east of 31st Avenue), 75% are White Non-Hispanic (up from 65% in 1990), 6% are African American (down from 29% in 1990), 4% are Asian (4% in 1990), 11% are Mixed race, and 4% are Hispanic. Census tract 77 with 5,382 residents, two-thirds of which is in the Central District, is 67% White Non-Hispanic, 13% African American, 7% Asian, 8% Mixed race, and 5% Hispanic.

== Historic landmarks ==
The Madrona neighborhood is rich in history and is home to many registered City of Seattle historic landmarks. The City of Seattle alone has over 400 landmarks, 5 of which are in Madrona.

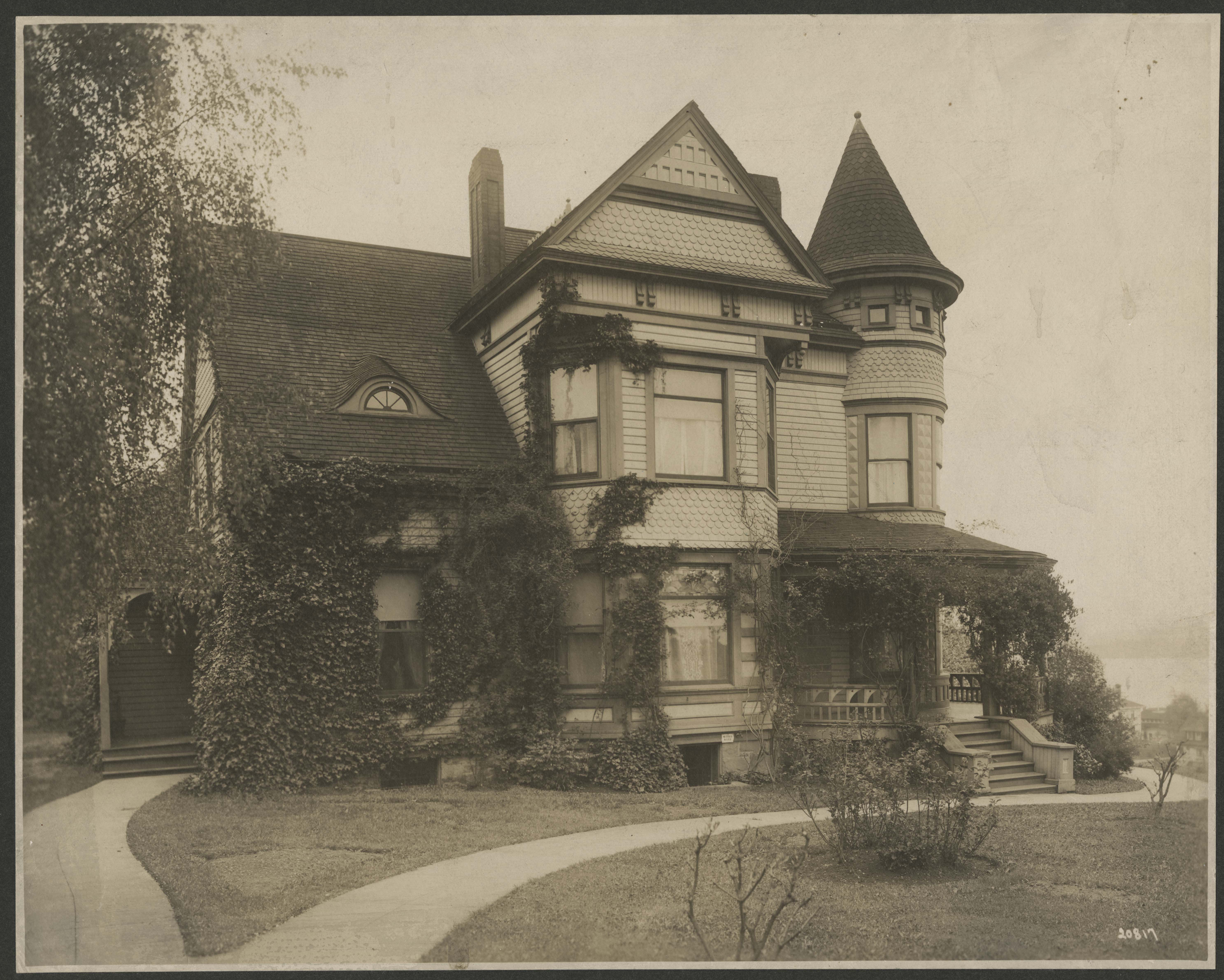
The Charles R. Bussell Residence in 1910

One residence is the Charles R. Bussell Residence, built in 1892 at 1630 36th Avenue. It faces both Lake Washington and the North Cascades. The architecture and interior take inspiration from a Mediterranean Revival architecture style, and as a result the Seattle City Council officially deemed the property a Seattle Landmark in 1979.

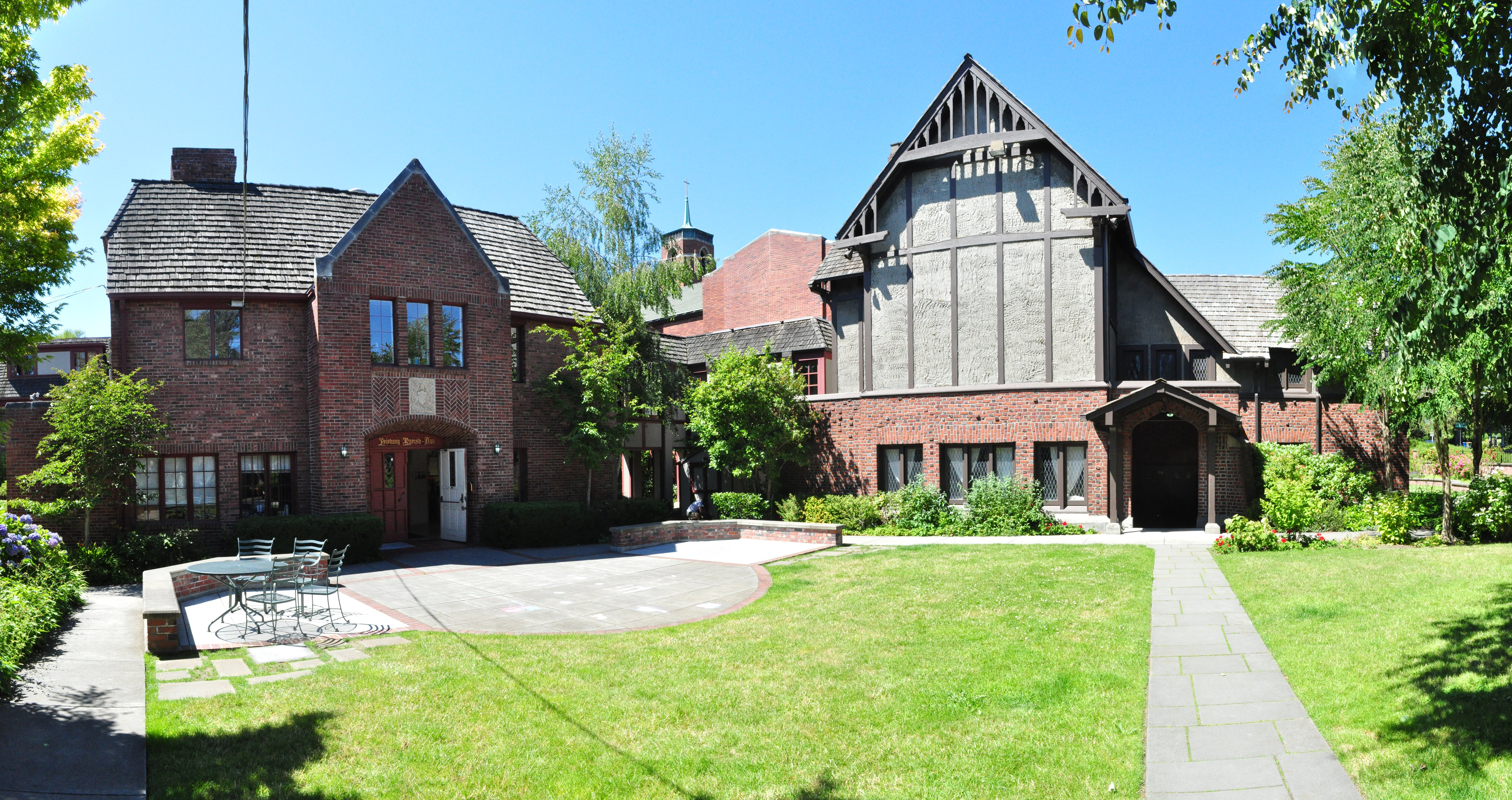
The Epiphany Parish Episcopal Church

The Epiphany Parish (Episcopal) is a church founded in 1907, located at 3719 Denny Way. The idea of the church originally came from Bishop Frederick W. Keator alongside other members of the St. Mark's Episcopal. It was then made in 1911, designed by Ellsworth Storey, and became an official Seattle landmark in 1978.

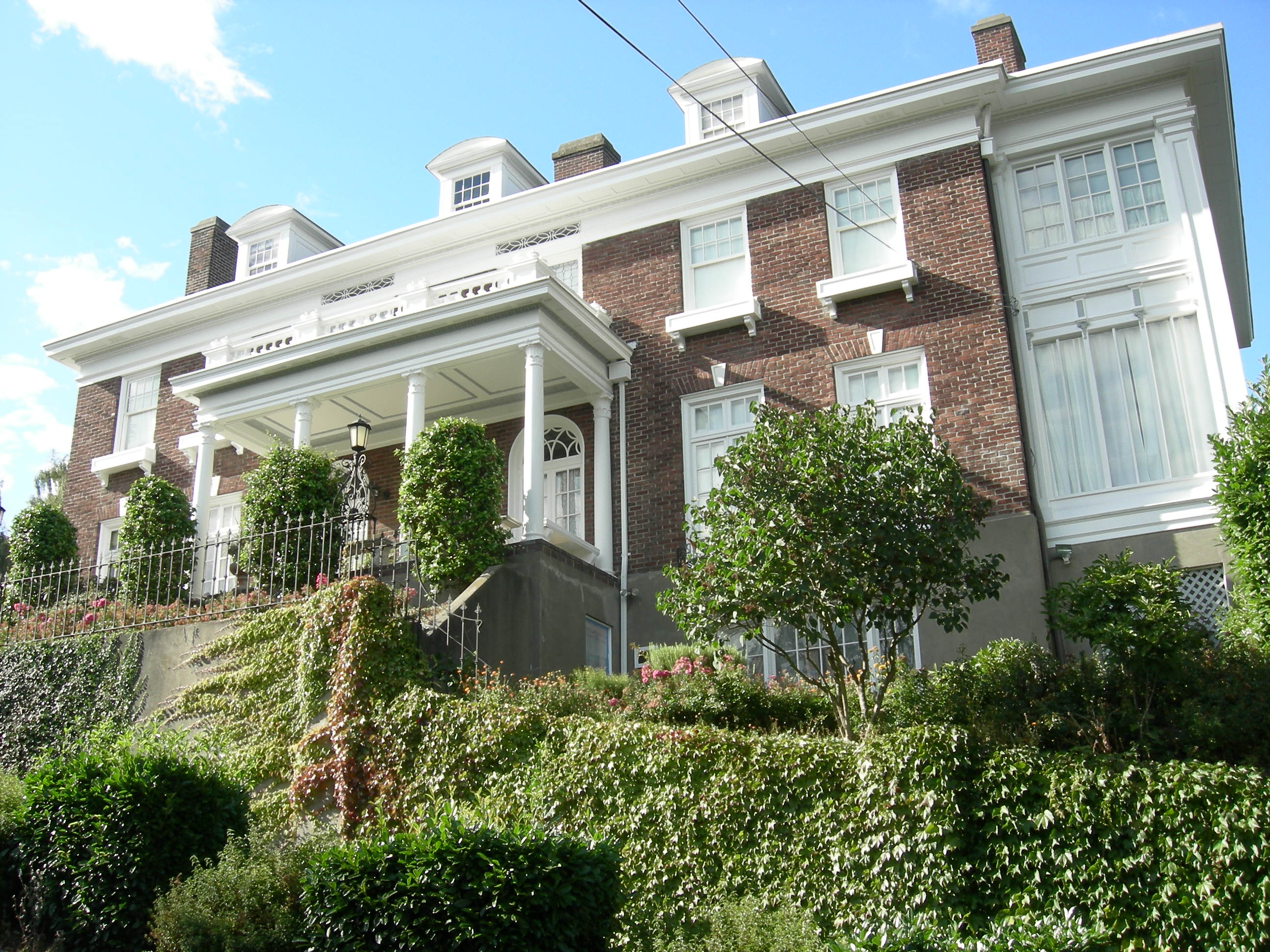
The Raymond/Ogden mansion

Another residence is the 1912 Raymond/Ogden residence located at 702 35th Avenue. It was designed for a wealthy surgeon, Dr. Alfred Raymond, by Joseph S. Cote, utilizing a Georgian architecture style. The massive residence had dozens of rooms, including a ballroom. In 1949, the residence was taken up by Myron Ogden, and then a decade later was used for foreign governments, resulting in it becoming a historic landmark in 1978.

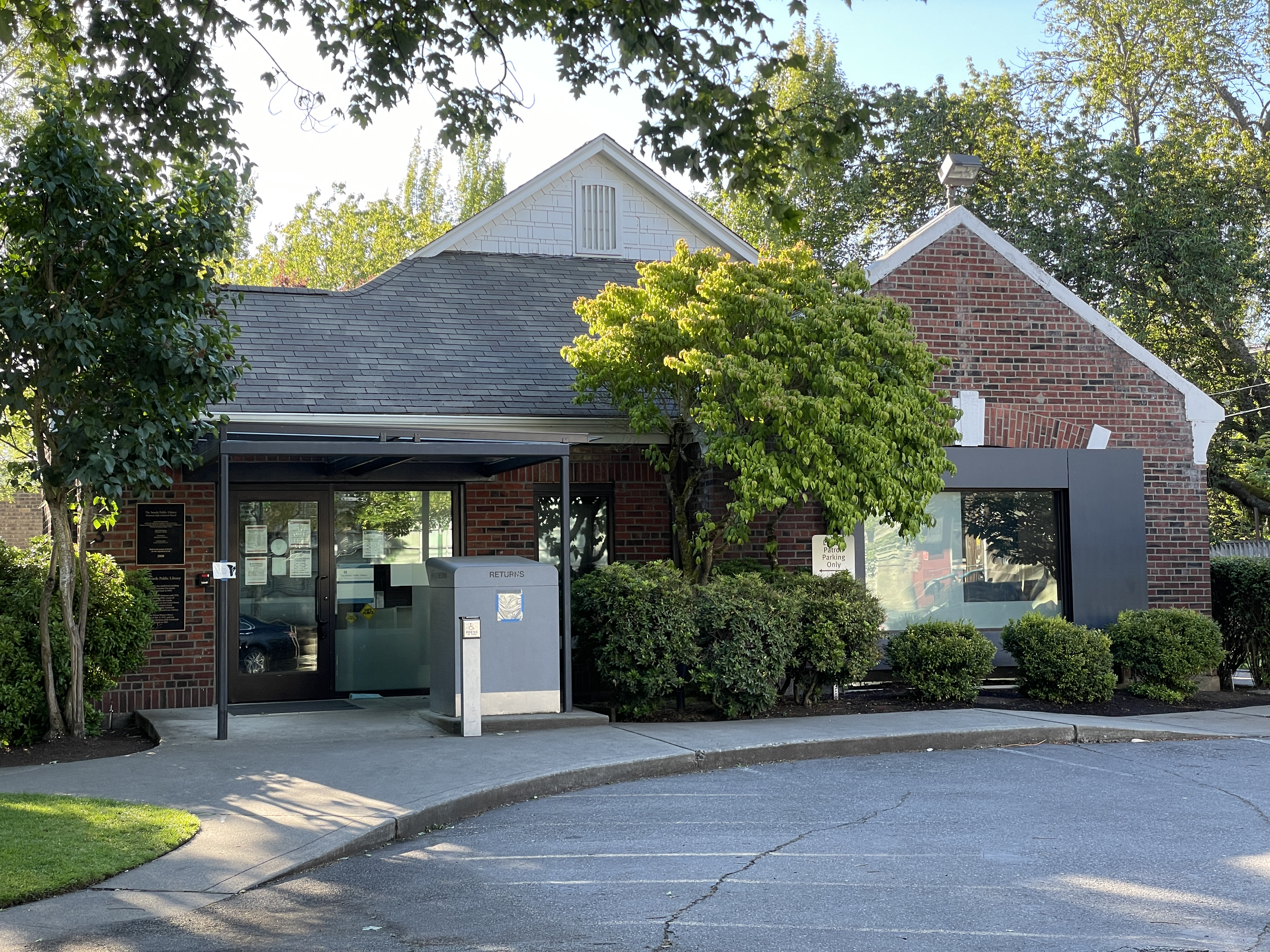
The Madrona–Sally Goldmark Branch Library

The Madrona–Sally Goldmark Branch Library became a landmark in 1971. It was originally a Fire Station constructed in 1919, but then became a temporary reading center in 1971. When the fire station closed, the city repurposed the building and called it the Stationhouse Branch Library in 1973. In 1986, it was renamed to the Madrona–Sally Goldmark Branch Library in honor of a community leader, Sally Goldmark.

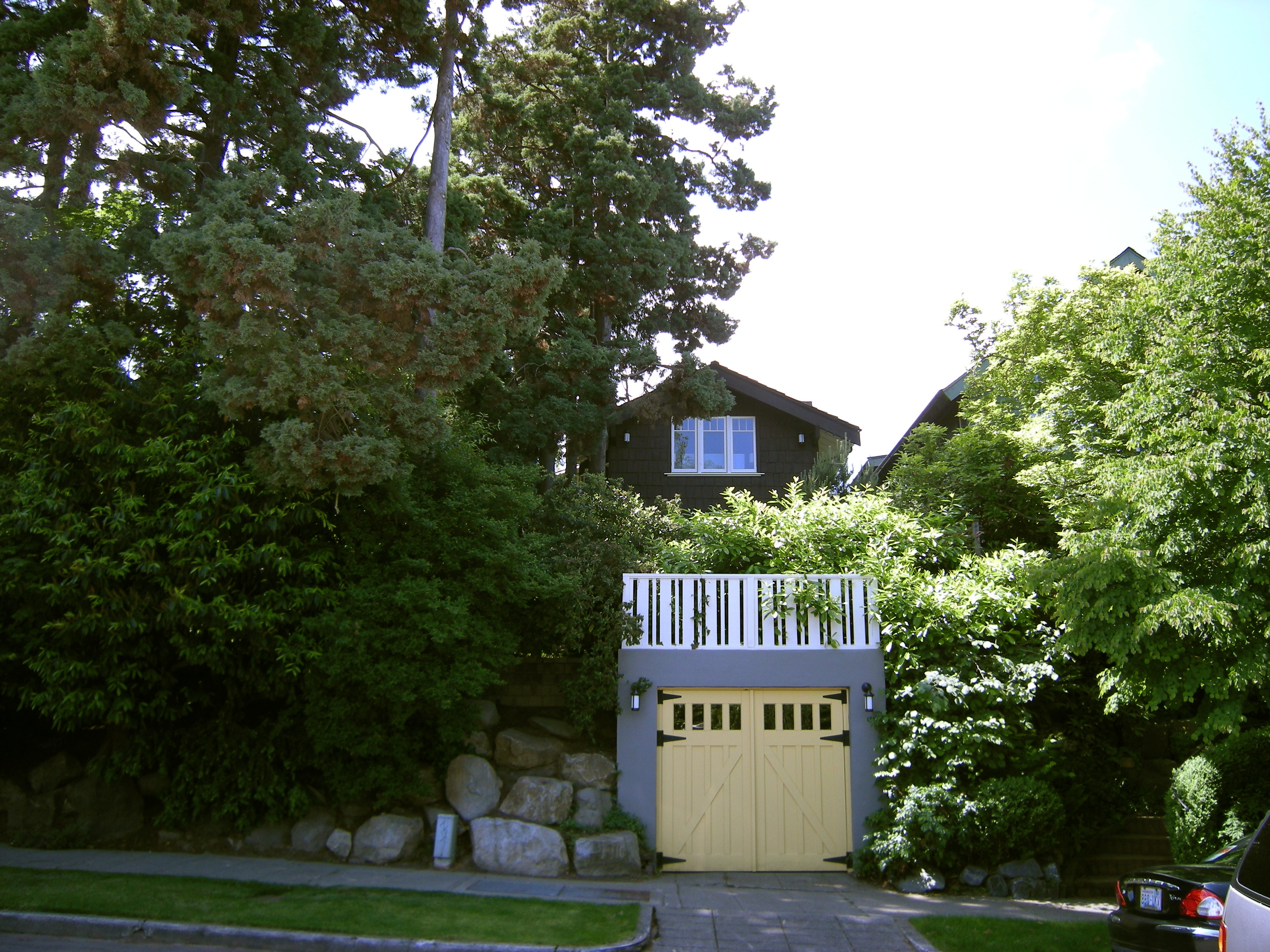
One of the Brehm Brothers Houses

The Brehm Brothers Houses are two homes placed on one lot located at 219-221 36th Avenue E, Seattle, for two brothers. The houses were designed using the American Craftsman style by using Northwest materials. They officially became a Seattle Landmark in 1979.
