= Dan Ostermiller =

American sculptor (born 1956)

Dan Ostermiller (born 1956) is an American sculptor best known for his depictions of animals. As of 2012, he is president of the National Sculpture Society. Born in Cheyenne, Wyoming, he resides in Loveland, Colorado.

== Works ==
Ostermiller's works are on display in numerous public venues including:

- National Museum of Wildlife Art
- Wyoming State Capitol
- Grand Teton National Park
- Denver Art Museum – Scottish Angus Cow and Calf pieces together weigh over 15,000 pounds (6,800 kg)
- Public art in Kirkland, Washington
- Powell Gardens Kansas City's botanical garden, near Kingsville, Missouri
- Eagle Creek Park, Indianapolis
