= Carolyn Law =

American mixed media artist and public sculptor

Carolyn Law (born 1951) is an American artist known for her mixed media and public artworks.

== Public art ==
- 2011, Social Intricacy/The Beach, Kirkland Transit Center, Seattle
- 2010, Wenatchee Sewage Treatment Plant, Wenatchee, Washington
- 2006, Before Now, Depot Park, Santa Cruz, California
- 2001 Tonalea Landmarks, Scottsdale, Arizona

== Collections ==
Works by Law are included in the collections of the Seattle Art Museum and the Washington State Arts Commission.
