= Richard Beyer =

American artist (1925–2012)

- Born: July 26, 1925; Washington, D.C., U.S.
- Died: April 9, 2012 (aged 86); New York City, U.S.
- Education: Columbia University
- Known for: Public sculpture
- Notable work: Waiting for the Interurban
- Website: richbeyersculpture.com

Richard Sternoff Beyer (July 26, 1925 – April 9, 2012) was an American sculptor from Pateros, Washington. Between 1968 and 2006, Beyer made over 90 sculptures.

== Early life and education ==
Beyer was born in Washington, D.C., on July 26, 1925. He was raised in Northern Virginia, and graduated from Fairfax High School in 1943.

Beyer enlisted in the U.S. Army in World War II, and served from 1944 to 1946, and was in the Battle of the Bulge.

Beyer earned a degree in social sciences from Columbia University, He moved to Seattle to work on an economics Ph.D. at University of Washington but did not complete the program.

At age 75, in 2001, Beyer suffered a stroke, but he continued to create art. He died in New York City on April 9, 2012, after another stroke.

== Work ==
Beyer was best known for his sculpture Waiting for the Interurban located in the Fremont neighborhood of Seattle, Washington. The sculpture, which is one of the most popular works of art in Seattle, was commissioned by the Fremont Arts Council and dedicated in 1978. It depicts six people and a dog waiting for the Seattle to Everett Interurban, a public transportation service that ended in the 1930s.

Other sculptures by Beyer include a statue of Ivar Haglund in Seattle (Ivar Feeding the Gulls, 1988), several sculptures in Kirkland, Washington, a statue of Christopher Columbus in Columbus, Georgia, a sculpture of a bull sitting on a bench in Ellensburg, Washington, a sculpture of a fisherman kissing a fish in Des Moines, Washington, and a sculpture of a kissing couple in Olympia, Washington described as "perhaps Olympia's most popular and well-known piece of public art". The Traveler (nicknamed "Art") is installed in Bend. The Charles Frederic Swigert Jr. Memorial Fountain is installed at the Oregon Zoo in Portland, Oregon.
