= Steve Badanes =

American architect

Steven Paul "Steve" Badanes is an American architect widely known for his practice and teaching of design/build. He is a founding member of the Jersey Devil design/build practice, and is currently a Professor in the University of Washington Department of Architecture, where he holds the Howard S. Wright Endowed Chair of the University of Washington College of Built Environments.

Badanes received his Bachelor of Arts from Wesleyan University in 1967, and his Master of Architecture (M.Arch.) from Princeton University in 1971. Seeking an alternative to conventional practice, Badanes and his partners Jim Adamson (who now also teaches a design/build course at the University of Miami) and John Ringel founded the Jersey Devil design/build firm in 1972. The firm has designed and built a wide variety of projects over the ensuing three decades. Their work has been the subject of three books, Jersey Devil Design/Build Book (1985), Devil's Workshop: 25 Years of Jersey Devil Architecture (1997) and 'Design/Build With Jersey Devil: A Handbook for Education and Practice'. Their work has also been featured in numerous articles in various professional and popular media.

Badanes has taught at various architecture and art schools since the 1980s. He has been on the board of directors of the Yestermorrow Design/Build School in Waitsfield, Vermont, since 1983, and regularly teaches there in the summer. He first taught at the University of Washington in 1988. In 1996, he accepted an appointment as a permanent member of the UW faculty and is the first to hold the Howard S. Wright Endowed Chair. He typically teaches a design/build studio every year in the spring.

He is also a consultant and frequent visiting critic at the Rural Studio of Auburn University.

The Association of Collegiate Schools of Architecture (ACSA) honored Badanes with the ACSA Distinguished Professor Award in 2001–2.

== See also ==
- Fremont Troll
- Kobe Terrace (Seattle)
