= Lake Washington Institute of Technology =

Public college in Kirkland, Washington, US

- Former name: Lake Washington Technical College
- Motto: Practical. Purposeful. Promising.
- Type: Public
- Established: 1949
- Budget: $25.2 million
- President: Amy Morrison Goings
- Students: 6,571
- Location: Kirkland, Washington, U.S. 47°42′19″N 122°10′01″W
- Campus: Suburban
- Colours: Teal and Gold
- Website: lwtech.edu

The Lake Washington Institute of Technology (LWTech) is a public community college in Kirkland, Washington. LWTech is a member of the Washington State Board for Community and Technical Colleges and offers bachelor's degrees, associate degrees, and professional certificates in more than 40 areas of study.

In addition to regular enrollment, LWTech offers a Technical Academy, a full-time special purpose high school program giving qualifying students, ages 16 to 20, an opportunity to complete their high school diploma and to earn a two-year college technical degree at the same time. Other high school programs include, Running Start, Open Doors, Tech Prep, Adult High School Completion, and WANIC. In addition to high school diplomas, these students can also earn associate degrees.

LWTech has one of the highest completion rates in Washington.

== History ==
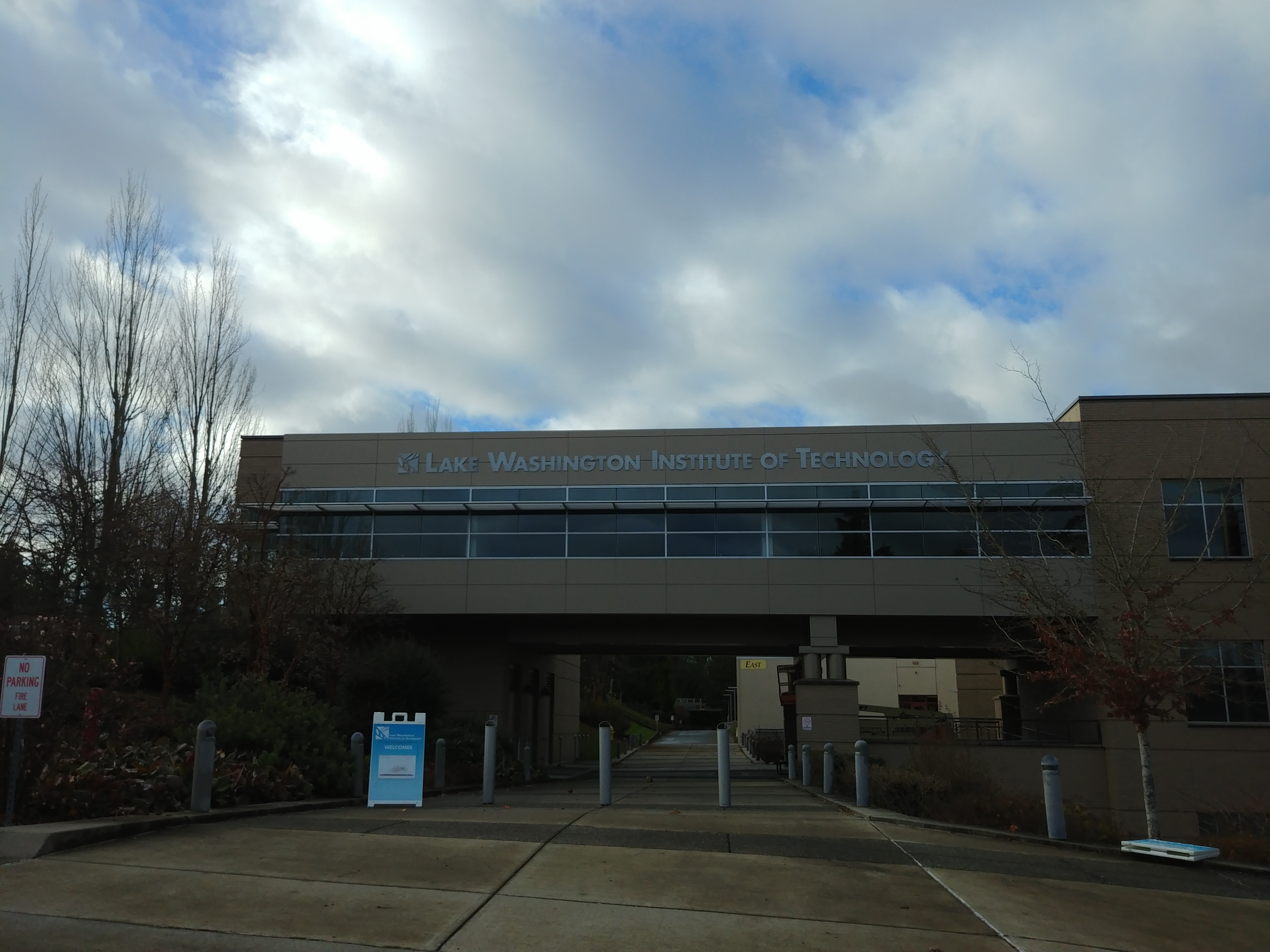
Exterior of the Allied Health Building

Lake Washington Institute of Technology was founded in 1949 by Lake Washington School District as an adult vocational training program. At first only offering a sewing program, it expanded to other vocations over the years, including automotive, culinary arts, and engineering. In 1978, local taxpayers passed a bond issue to construct a new facility for the school. A site then north of Kirkland near Totem Lake (since annexed) was chosen and the school opened by 1983. In 1991 LWTech became independent of the school district and on September 1, 1991 the institute became a degree-granting technical college with all the rights and responsibilities of a technical college as prescribed by state law. The school dental program was initiated in the fall of 1996, the state's first new program in 22 years.

Additions were added to the school including a new administration building in 1994. Ground was broken on August 12, 2002 for a new 60,000-square-foot (5,600 m^{2}) $17 million technology building adjoining the administration (or West Building) that was to add twenty classrooms and a new multi-level library facility to the school. The building was designed by architect Harry Cummings of Cummings & Associates with input from faculty, students and regional employers.

The college expanded again in 2004 with a satellite campus on the edge of Marymoor Park in Redmond replacing a small training building owned by the school that was formerly a missile-repair shop built during the Cold War as part of the Nike Ajax missile-defense system. The 21,000-square-foot (2,000 m^{2}) building features five classrooms, a library, auditorium and office and eating spaces.

On April 18, 2011, Washington Governor Christine Gregoire signed Substitute Senate Bill 5664 to change the name of Lake Washington Technical College to Lake Washington Institute of Technology. The name change took effect on July 22, 2011. The Redmond Campus was closed in spring of 2017. The college currently leases out its Redmond Campus Building to the City of Redmond.

In 2011, LWTech opened its new 83,000-square-foot (7,700 m^{2}) Allied Health building, housing the college's ever expanding health services programs.

== Accreditation ==
Lake Washington Institute of Technology is accredited by the Northwest Commission on Colleges and Universities at the associate degree level and at the baccalaureate degree level to include the Bachelor of Technology in Applied Design, Bachelor of Applied Science in Public Health, Bachelor of Applied Science in Transportation and Logistics Management, Bachelor of Applied Science in Behavioral Health Care, Bachelor of Applied Science in Dental Hygiene, Bachelor of Applied Science in Digital Gaming and Interactive Media, Bachelor of Applied Science in Funeral Service Education, and a Bachelor of Applied Science in Computing and Software Development.

== Academics ==
Lake Washington Institute of Technology's primary purpose is to prepare people for employment, career change, or upgrading occupational skills. All technical courses offer job-related learning experiences and basic education skills, which are needed and in demand by the current job market. Most students enroll in courses which operate on an open-entry, open-exit system.

Training is available in more than 40 areas of instruction, with more than 100 degree and certificate options. LWTech also offers the Bachelor of Technology in Applied Design (BTAD) program, the first in Washington State. BTAD offers professionals working in the design field the opportunity to earn a four-year degree while obtaining management and supervisory skills. In 2009, LWTech debuted a Funeral Service Education program. This two-year Associate of Applied Science degree program, the only one in Washington, prepares students for employment as funeral directors or professional embalmers.

== Diversity ==
In October 2017, Lake Washington Institute of Technology opened its new diversity center called the RISE Center: Resources for Inclusion, Support, and Empowerment. The center aims to build an equitable and inclusive campus environment for all students and provides support services for students from traditionally underrepresented and under-served backgrounds, such as students from minoritized ethnic/racial groups, students with disabilities, first-generation college students (those who are the first in their family to attend/graduate from college), undocumented students, and members of the Lesbian, Gay, Bisexual, Transgender, and Queer (LGBTQ) community.

== Partnerships ==
In 2017 Lake Washington Institute of Technology signed a memorandum of understanding with the British Columbia Institute of Technology in Canada and the Oregon Institute of Technology to collaborate in four key areas to bring industry-aligned talent to the Cascadia Innovation Corridor's workforce needs. Microsoft President, Brad Smith, announced the partnership. The memorandum that the three institutions signed outlines four areas for collaboration, which focus on students, faculty, industry, and applied research.

== Community ==
=== Events ===
==== Community Resource Fair ====
Lake Washington Institute of Technology often hosts events geared toward its community members. Events include the monthly Community Resource Fair, in partnership with the City of Kirkland, City of Redmond, WorkSource Seattle-King County, and the King County Library System. The goal of the event is to provide community and college resources in one location to support low-income, marginalized populations who face barriers in the Seattle Eastside communities. The resource fair services include housing, transportation, food assistance, mental health, immigrant/refugee services, health, and dental care, training and education, domestic violence, disability support, and more.

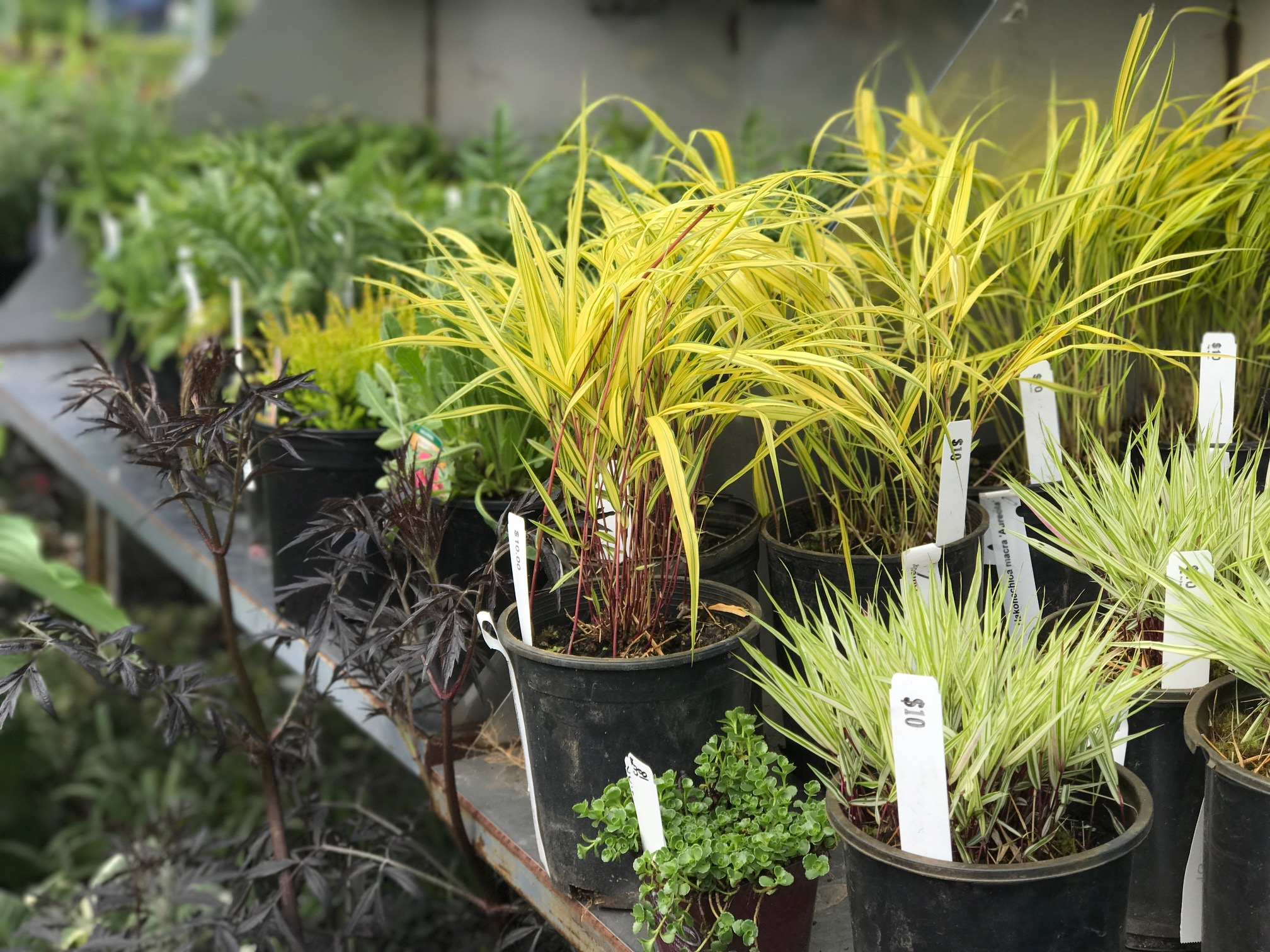
Plants for sale at the Lake Washington Institute of Technology Annual Plant Sale

==== Annual Spring Plant Sale ====
The Spring Plant Sale, one of the most popular events that takes place at Lake Washington Institute of Technology (LWTech), features a variety of plants grown from seed to sale by LWTech environmental horticulture students, including fuchsia baskets, annuals, vegetable starts, succulents, perennials, herb starts, and hundreds of bedding plants. LWTech environmental horticulture students grow over a hundred crops. These include vegetables and herbs that grow exceptionally well in the Pacific Northwest climate. Proceeds from the annual plant sale go to the environmental horticulture program and student scholarships.
