= Fremont Troll =

Public sculpture In Seattle, Washington, U.S.

Coordinates: 47°39′03″N 122°20′50″W

- Artists: Steve Badanes; Will Martin; Donna Walter; Ross Whitehead
- Year: 1990
- Type: Sculpture
- Dimensions: 5.5 m (18 ft)
- Location: Seattle
- Owner: City of Seattle

The Fremont Troll (also known as The Troll, or the Troll Under the Bridge) is a public sculpture in Fremont, Seattle, Washington, United States.

== Description ==
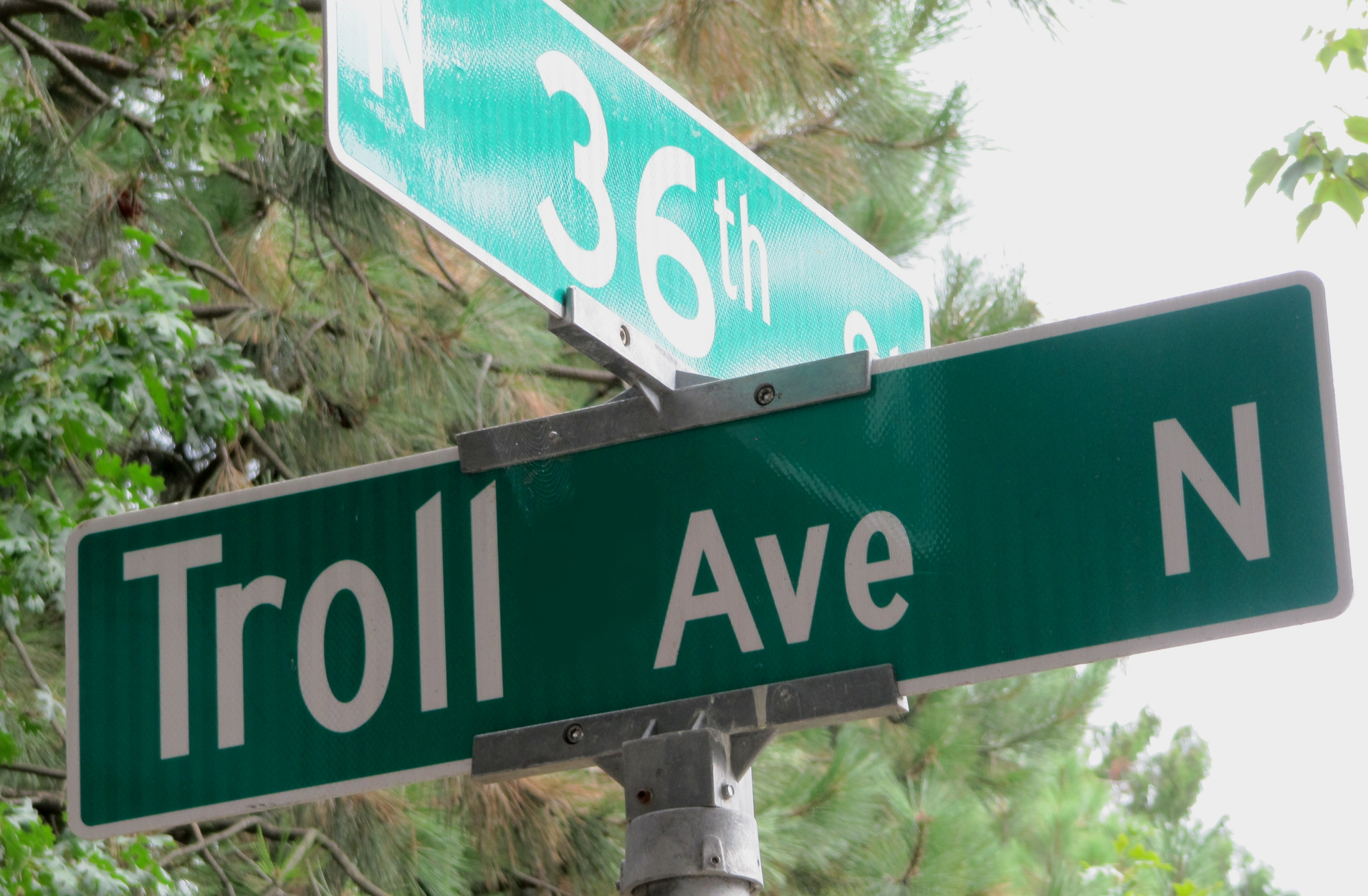
Sign for "Troll Avenue"

The Troll is a mixed media colossal statue, located on N. 36th Street at Troll Avenue N., under the north end of the George Washington Memorial Bridge (also known as the Aurora Bridge). It is clutching an actual Volkswagen Beetle, as if it had just swiped it from the roadway above. The vehicle has a California license plate. Originally, the car held a time capsule, including a plaster bust of Elvis Presley, which was stolen when the sculpture was vandalized.

The Troll is 18 ft (5.5 m) high, weighs 13,000 lb (5,900 kg), and is made of steel rebar, wire, and concrete.

== Artists and inspiration ==
The Troll was sculpted by four artists: Steve Badanes, Will Martin, Donna Walter, and Ross Whitehead. The idea of a troll living under a bridge is derived from the Scandinavian (Norwegian) folklore.

The artists have copyright to the Troll images. They have sued businesses that use its image commercially without written permission. Postcards, beer, and other products approved by the artists are commercially available, and use is free to non-profit organizations.

== History ==
In 1990, the Fremont Arts Council launched an art competition for the area under the bridge with the intent to construct hostile architecture to deter the presence of "rodents, mattresses, beer cans, [and] guys sleeping" there, believing that the solution to the issue was "having a piece of art" instead. The piece, built later that same year, easily won the competition, and was meant to become a cultural icon of the city from its conception. The vote in favor of the "funky" troll was also motivated by concerns about increased development in Fremont, including numerous large apartment buildings and an office park, urbanizing the largely residential neighborhood.

The construction of the troll provoked immediate complaints from homeless people who previously lived under the bridge, and in 1991, just a year after it was erected, neighbors funded powerful floodlights to deter squatters and "late-night revelers" from acts of vandalism targeting the troll's beard and hair, as well as the continued dumping of trash around it by homeless people who used to live there. Despite the intent of the arts council, the sculpture has periodically been the target of vandalism, although local activists have made efforts to clean graffiti on a regular basis, and the city of Seattle has swept homeless encampments adjacent to the sculpture following repeated drug overdoses in January 2019; from January to mid-May alone, the city received 28 complaints about needles or homelessness within a block of the sculpture.

In 2005, the segment of Aurora Avenue North under the bridge, running downhill from the Troll to North 34th Street was renamed "Troll Avenue" in honor of the sculpture. In 2011, the Fremont Arts Council licensed a Chia Pet based on the Fremont Troll that was sold at a local drug store chain.

The stairway leading to the top of the sculpture was rebuilt in September 2023 using funds from the Move Seattle levy; the Troll was planned to be surrounded by more vegetation planted by volunteers the following month.

== In popular culture ==
The 1999 romantic comedy film 10 Things I Hate About You features the Fremont Troll in a scene between Joseph Gordon-Levitt's and Larisa Oleynik's characters.

The 2015 video game Life is Strange features the Fremont Troll partway through the first episode, in which the player can find a picture of the protagonist, Max, and two of her friends from her time living in Seattle, climbing on the sculpture.

The seventh and final season of the ABC fantasy-drama series Once Upon a Time features a fictionalized version of the sculpture. Filming for the series took place in Vancouver, Canada, as such, a replica of the sculpture was built for the show. In the season's fourteenth episode, "The Girl in the Tower", a backstory for the sculpture is revealed, which includes references to the 1982 children's book The BFG.

In 2013, a movie documentary, The Hall of Giants - The Story of Fremont & the Troll was completed. It is an Anarky Productions film directed by Michael Falcone. It was featured at several international film festivals.

In 2016, the Chicago rock band Majungas released "The Fremont Troll" off their Seattle Rock album.

In 2022, the Seattle Kraken introduced Buoy, a mascot said to be the Fremont Troll's nephew.

In 2022, the Seattle Repertory Theatre produced "Lydia and the Troll" a play that heavily featured the Fremont Troll.

== See also ==
- Northwest Trolls: Way of the Bird King
