= Renee Erickson =

Renee Erickson may refer to:

- Renee Erickson (chef) (born 1972), Seattle-based chef
- Renee Erickson (politician), American school principal and politician from Kansas
