= Sour Punch =

Brand of sour candy

Sour Punch is a brand of sour extruded candy manufactured in La Porte, Indiana by the American Licorice Company.

== Development ==
American Licorice Company launched Sour Punch in 1990 as their first sour candy.

The product is sold in several forms, including Straws, Bites, Ropes, Twists, and Gummies.

Like many other sour candies, they are coated with sour sugar.

One serving size of Sour Punch twists contains 150 calories.

The candy suits the lactose intolerant, containing no milk products.

== Original flavors ==
- Chargin' Cherry
- Strikin' Strawberry
- Orange
- Zappin' Apple
- Zip Zappin' Watermelon
- Blue Razmatazz (Blue raspberry)
- Grape
- Discontinued flavors: Lemon (reintroduced in 2015 in the "Rainbow Straws" pack)

== See also ==
- American Licorice Company
- Red Vines
