= Fremont, Seattle =

Fremont
- Seattle Neighborhood
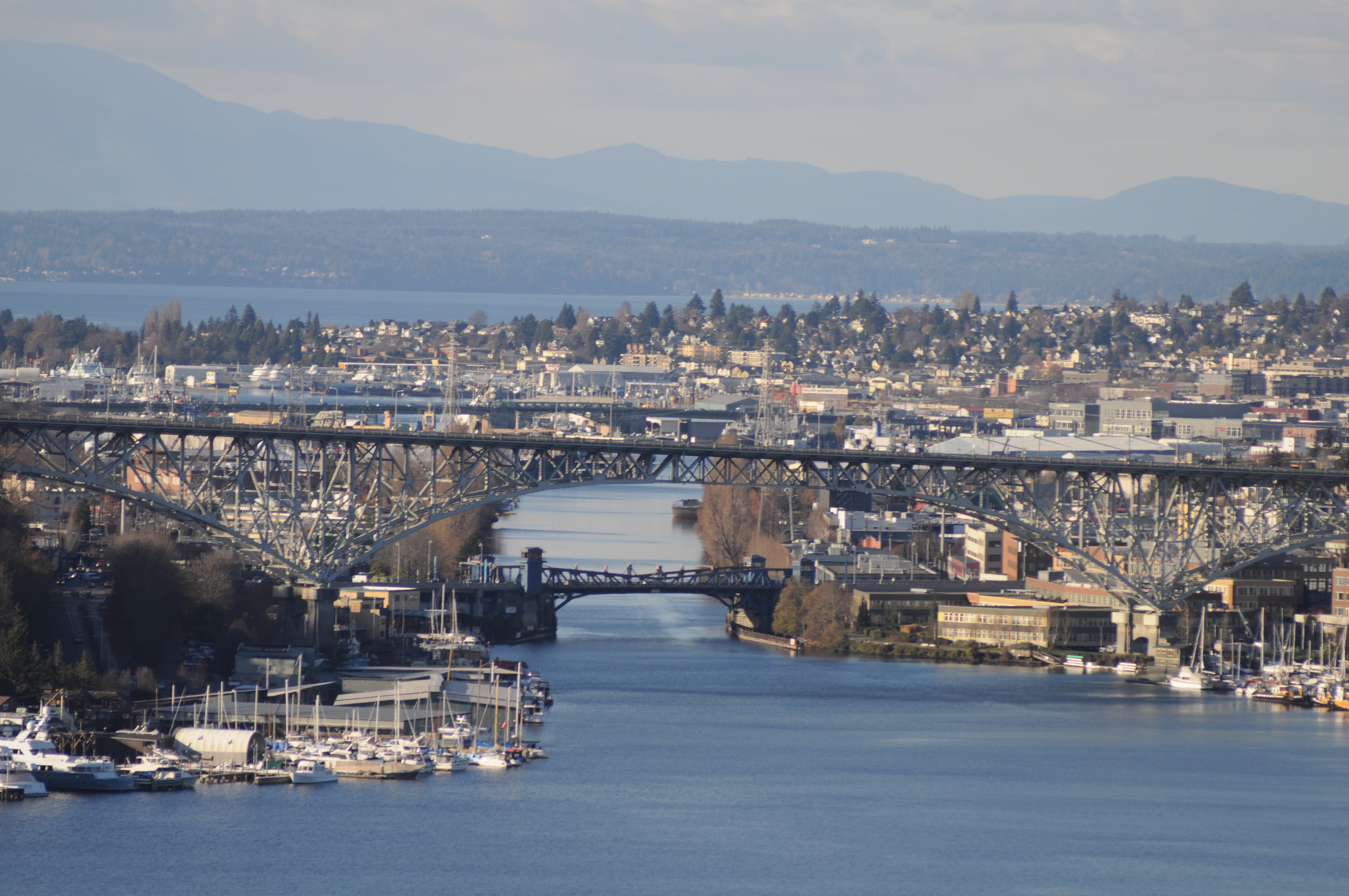
- The Fremont Cut of the Lake Washington Ship Canal, seen from the grounds of the St. Mark's Episcopal Cathedral complex, across Lake Union

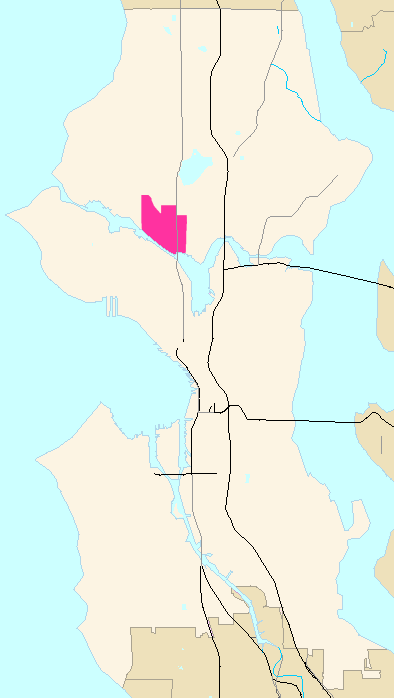
- Fremont's location in Seattle
- Coordinates: 47.6505°N 122.3499°W
- Country: United States
- State: Washington
- City: Seattle
- City Council: District 6
- Neighborhood Council: Lake Union District
- Police District: North Precinct, B2
- Legislative District: 43rd
- Established: May 8, 1888 (first plat); Annexed to Seattle on May 3, 1891
- Founder: Gerald and Carrie Blewett
- Named for: Fremont, Nebraska

Area
  - Total: 0.89 sq mi (2.3 km^{2})

Population
  - Total: 11,345
  - Density: 13,000/sq mi (4,900/km^{2})
- ZIP Code: 98103, 98107

Fremont is a neighborhood in northern Seattle, Washington, United States. Originally a separate city, it was annexed to Seattle in 1891. It is named after Fremont, Nebraska, the hometown of two of its founders: Luther H. Griffith and Edward Blewett.

== Geography ==
Fremont is situated along the Fremont Cut of the Lake Washington Ship Canal to the north of Queen Anne, the east of Ballard, the south of Phinney Ridge, and the southwest of Wallingford. Its boundaries are not formally fixed, but they can be thought of as consisting of the Ship Canal to the south, Stone Way N. to the east, N. 50th Street to the north, and 8th Avenue N.W. to the west.

The neighborhood's main thoroughfares are Fremont and Aurora Avenues N. (north- and southbound) and N. 46th, 45th, 36th, and 34th Streets (east- and westbound). The Aurora Bridge (George Washington Memorial Bridge) carries Aurora Avenue (State Route 99) over the Ship Canal to the top of Queen Anne Hill, and the Fremont Bridge carries Fremont Avenue over the canal to the hill's base. A major shopping district is centered on Fremont Avenue N. just north of the bridge.

== History ==
Coast Salish people have lived in the Seattle area for thousands of years. Traditional fishing sites were located where Fremont is today. The Fremont Cut was originally a small stream from Lake Union to Salmon Bay called gʷax̌ʷap (lit.: leak [at] bottom end). Settlers later called this stream the Outlet and Ross Creek. Several types of salmon ran there, and people hit the water to guide fish into the small creek sč̓axʷʔalqu (thrashed water) for fishing. That stream is now piped under Fremont.

A few white families settled near the Fremont area from the 1850s onward, including the Ross family, namesake of the stream and other local sites. William A. Strickler's homestead included the main part of Fremont, and the forests there had been logged by 1880. New settlers displaced many Native residents of the area, and those who remained were often restricted from their treaty-protected fishing rights.

=== 1880s ===
In 1883, work began on the Fremont Cut, sponsored by industrial land-owners nearby. J. J. Cummings and Co. dug the canal with horses and 100 men. Cummings promised not to hire Chinese workers due to growing racism in Seattle, but when construction difficulties arose, he subcontracted with the Wa Chong Company. The initial dig was finished around 1885, before mobs forced Chinese people to leave the region in the Seattle riot of 1886.

Fremont was platted in 1888 by a dentist and entrepreneur, Dr. E. C. Kilbourne, along with Luther H. Griffith and Edward Blewett. Griffith and Blewett were from Fremont, Nebraska, which they chose as the neighborhood's namesake. In May, construction began on Fremont's first building, the Occidental Hotel, and the site was photographed by Asahel Curtis. Also that year, the Seattle, Lake Shore and Eastern Railroad expanded from Seattle into Fremont, along the site of the current Burke-Gilman trail. More tracks were built over the following decades, for service to other parts of Seattle and intercity service to Everett. The area's industry centered on the lakeshore, including lumber mills, shingle mills, and an iron foundry. Fremont quickly expanded following the Great Seattle Fire in 1889. In 1891, Fremont and nearby neighborhoods annexed themselves to Seattle.

=== 1900s ===
Just like nearby North Seattle neighborhoods, Fremont had very few non-white residents throughout the 1900s. For many of these neighborhoods, this was a result of their campaigns to create racial restrictive covenants that blocked people of color from living there. Few of these covenants have been recovered from Fremont or Wallingford, but their demographics were very similar to covenant-dominated neighborhoods like Greenlake and Ballard. For example, in the 1960 census, over 20,000 white people lived in Fremont and Wallingford, but there were only 27 residents who identified as African American and 35 as "other races".

The neighborhood lost popularity after the Aurora Bridge was built over it in 1932, with rail and trolley service stopping over the next decade. This eventually attracted artists and students in the 1960s, making Fremont a countercultural center. The first Fremont Fair was held in 1972, and local organizations formed throughout that decade to promote Fremont art and community. Fremont also became the first region in Washington to create a curbside recycling program. In 1989, the Fremont Arts Council commissioned the Fremont Troll after holding a contest to design a use for the empty space under the Aurora Bridge. The neighborhood began gentrifying in the 1990s, and technology companies started moving in following Adobe in 1998.

== Counterculture ==
The Fremont Troll

Fremont is sometimes referred to as "The People's Republic of Fremont" or "The Artists' Republic of Fremont," and was at one time a center of counterculture; however, the neighborhood has become somewhat gentrified since the 1990s. It remains home to a controversial statue of Vladimir Lenin salvaged from Slovakia by an art lover from Washington state who was teaching in the area at the time. After the 1989 fall of the Communist government, he brought the statue to Fremont with money raised through a mortgage on his house. The Fremont Troll is an 18-foot-tall (5 m) concrete sculpture of a troll crushing a Volkswagen Beetle in its left hand, created in 1990 and situated under the north end of the Aurora Bridge. The street running under the bridge and ending at the Troll was renamed Troll Avenue N. in 2005.

The neighborhood also features various signs giving advice such as "set your watch back five minutes," "set your watch forward five minutes," and "throw your watch away." Other landmarks include the Fremont Rocket, a Fairchild C-119 tail boom modified to resemble a missile, and the outdoor sculpture Waiting for the Interurban.

Since the early 1970s some Fremont residents have been referring to their neighborhood as "The Center of the Universe" (which also appears on a large "Welcome" sign). An unofficial motto "De Libertas Quirkas" ("Freedom to be Peculiar" in mock Latin) appears in brochures and websites about the area.

== Events and institutions ==
The Fremont Arts Council sponsors several highly attended annual events in Fremont. The Summer Solstice Parade & Pageant has made Fremont famous for its nude Solstice Cyclists. Another event is Troll-a-ween.

Also important to Fremont is the large block on Linden Avenue N. that contains the B.F. Day Elementary School and B.F. Day Playground, two separate entities. B.F. Day is the longest continually operating school in the Seattle school district, having been founded in 1892.

Another longstanding institution is the Fremont branch of the Seattle Public Library. An informal library predated the 1891 annexation of Fremont to Seattle, and annexation made it the city's first branch library. The present structure dates from 1921.

Besides the B.F. Day playfield, Fremont has three small public parks, Fremont Peak Park just south of N. 45th Street, Ross Park and Playground at 3rd Avenue NW and NW 43rd Street, and A.B. Ernst Park next to the library. Ernst Park was named for Ambrose Ernst, a Fremont resident. He was known as the "Father of City Playfields". He served on the Board of Park Commissioners from 1906 to 1913 and helped implement Seattle's Olmsted parks plan.

The Burke–Gilman Trail passes through Fremont just north of the Lake Washington Ship Canal. The large Gas Works Park is just east of Fremont on the north shore of Lake Union.

== Companies and organizations ==
Fremont hosts the headquarters of evo, Brooks Sports, and Geocaching HQ, the parent company of Geocaching.com. The neighborhood also has several breweries including Fremont Brewing. Schilling Cider House is the taphouse of the Auburn-based Schilling Cider Company. The neighborhood also has several vintage stores, including the underground Fremont Vintage Mall. In 2021, Seattle Bouldering Project expanded to add a Fremont location. Charlie's Queer Books opened in 2023, becoming one of the few all-LGBTQ bookstores in the U.S.

A growing number of technology companies have offices in Fremont, including Adobe Systems, the Allen Institute for Brain Science, SDL PLC, Groundspeak, Impinj, Sporcle, and Tableau Software. Most of these offices are along the Lake Washington Ship Canal. Google opened its Fremont office in 2006, becoming its second Seattle-area location. Their campus grew to 300,000 square feet (28,000 m^{2}) and 1,350 employees by 2023, but the company announced its plan to move all of its Fremont workers to the South Lake Union office beginning in 2025.

The neighborhood is home to a number of nonprofit organizations, including Literacy Source and Provail, a provider of social services to people with disabilities and an affiliate of the United Cerebral Palsy network.

=== Historic ===
The original Redhook breweries were located in Fremont until their closures in 1988 and 2002, respectively. Theo Chocolate's factory and store took over the brewery location, but closed their factory in 2023 after merging with American Licorice. In 2025, Theo Chocolate closed the store as well. Hale's Ales was located in Fremont and hosted Seattle's annual Moisture Festival there until the brewery closed in 2022. Golf and daywear label Cutter & Buck had its headquarters in Fremont from around 2002 until 2015, when it moved to 101 Elliott Avenue West. The Whale Wins, which won founder Renee Erickson a 2016 James Beard Award for Best Chef: Northwest, closed in 2025.

A wedge-shaped building on Leary Way, a diagonal street cutting across Fremont from the adjacent Ballard neighborhood, once housed the legendary Seattle producer Jack Endino's Reciprocal Recording studio, where he recorded (among many other records) Nirvana's first demos and the band's debut on Sub Pop records, Bleach.

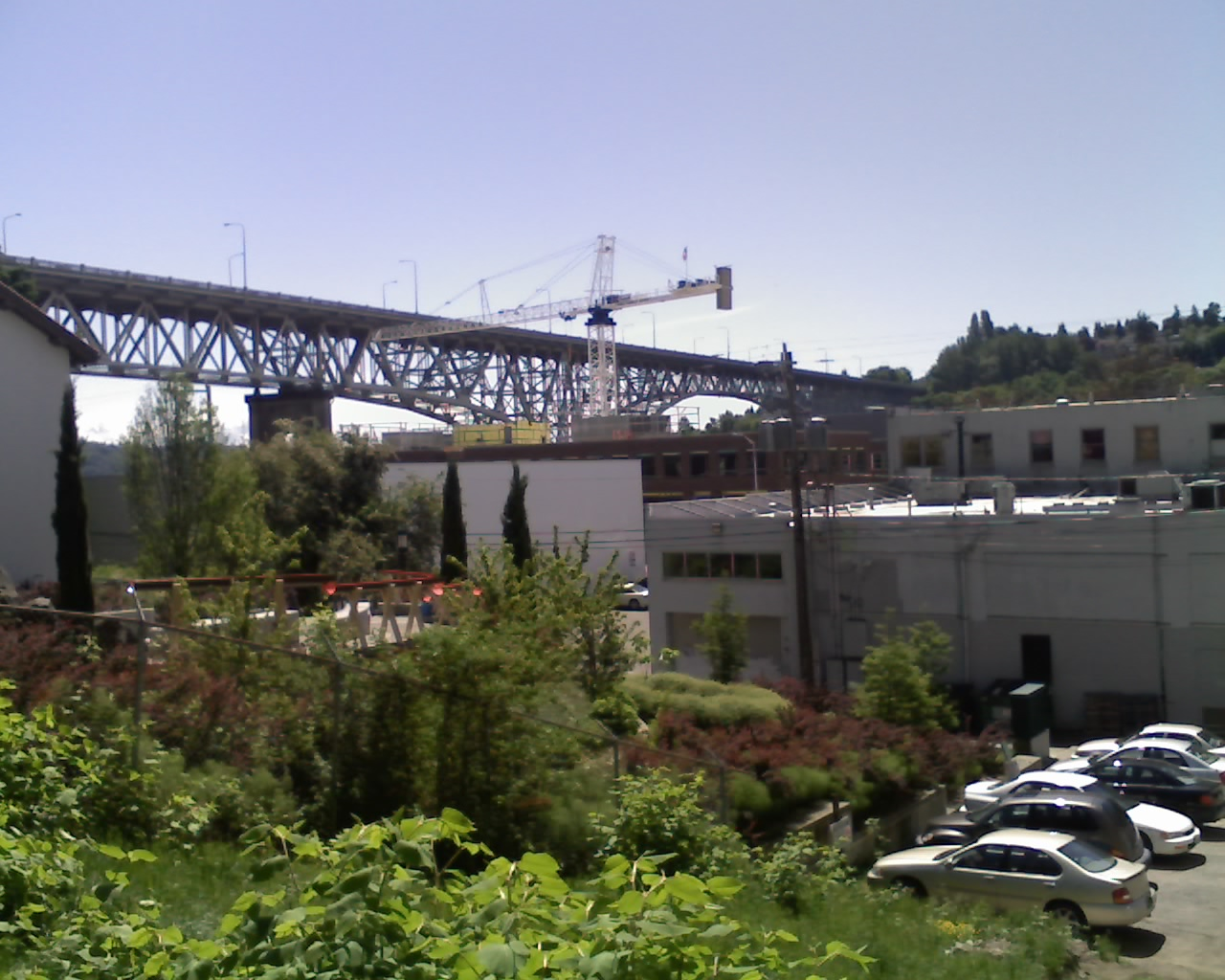
The Aurora Bridge from Fremont

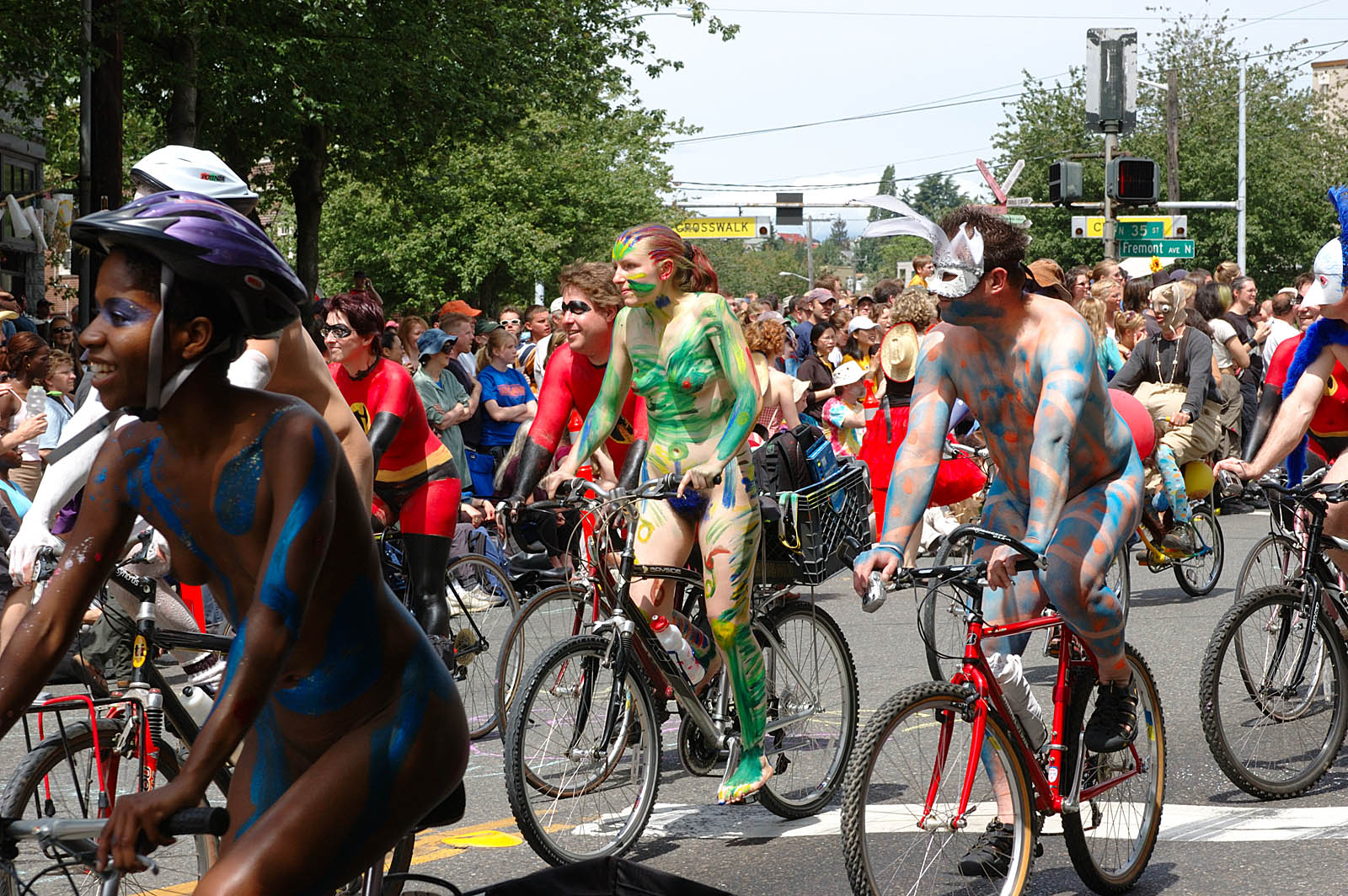
The Solstice Cyclists are known for riding nude through the neighborhood.

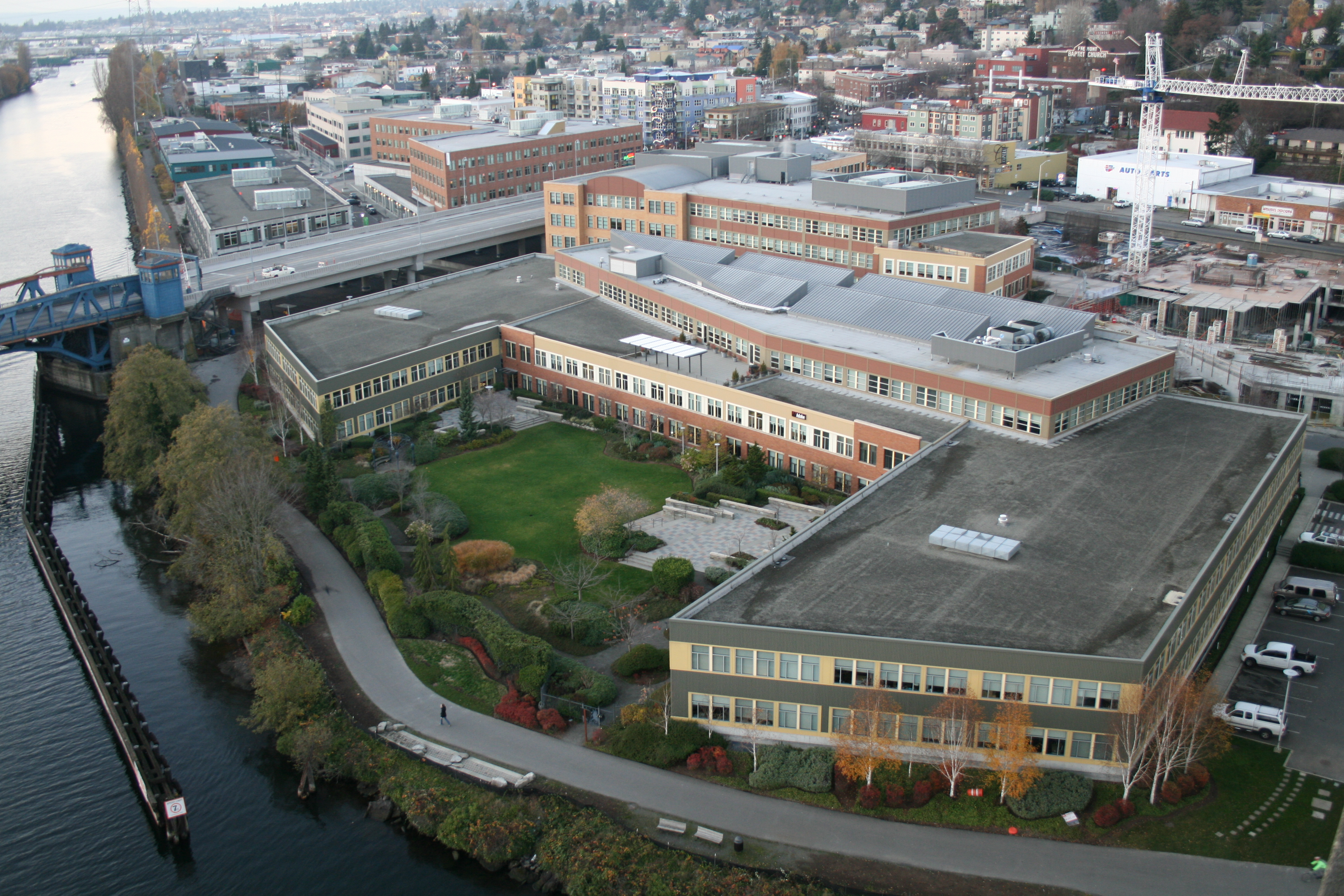
Adobe Systems campus on the Fremont Cut

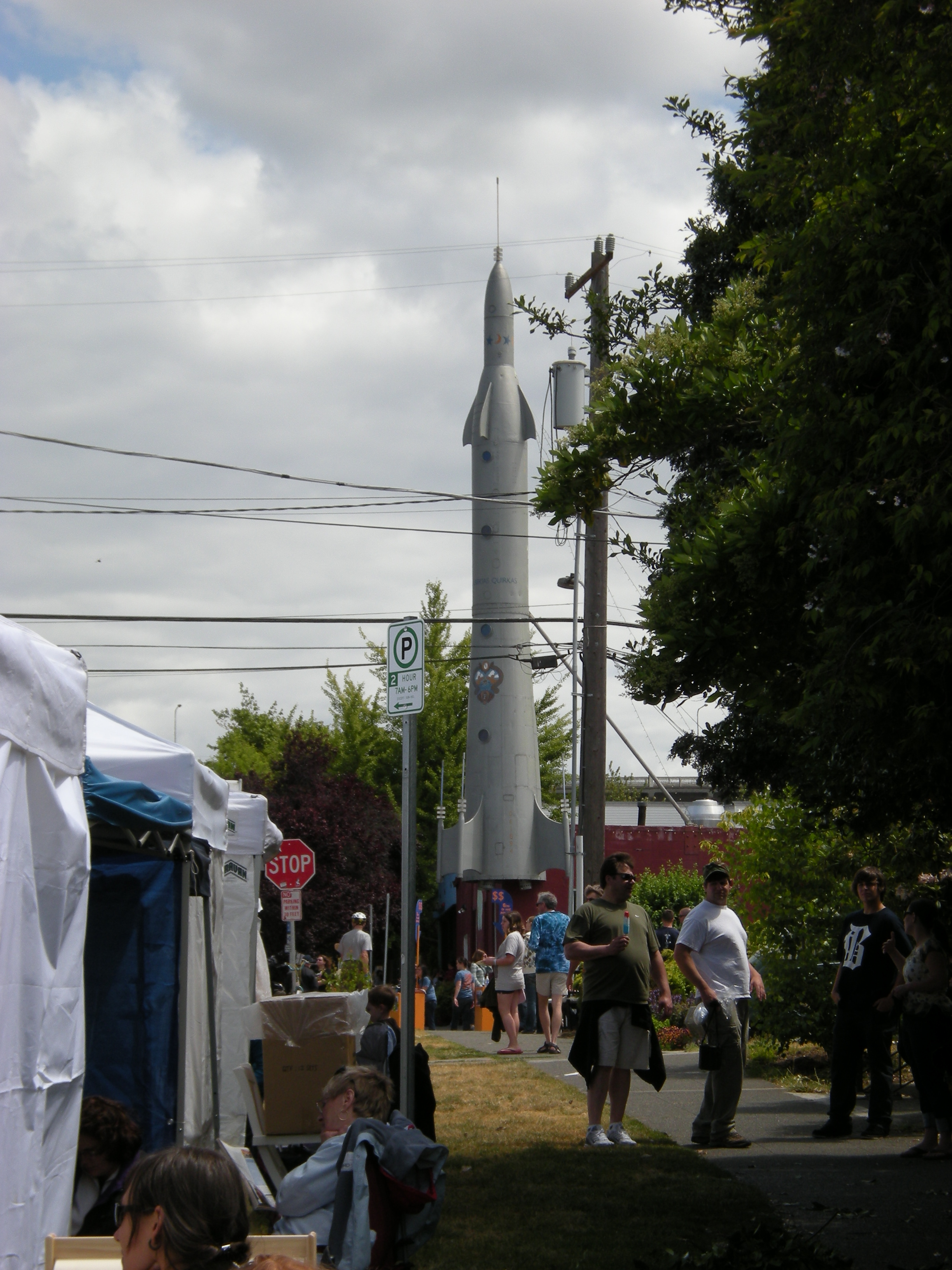
The Fremont Rocket

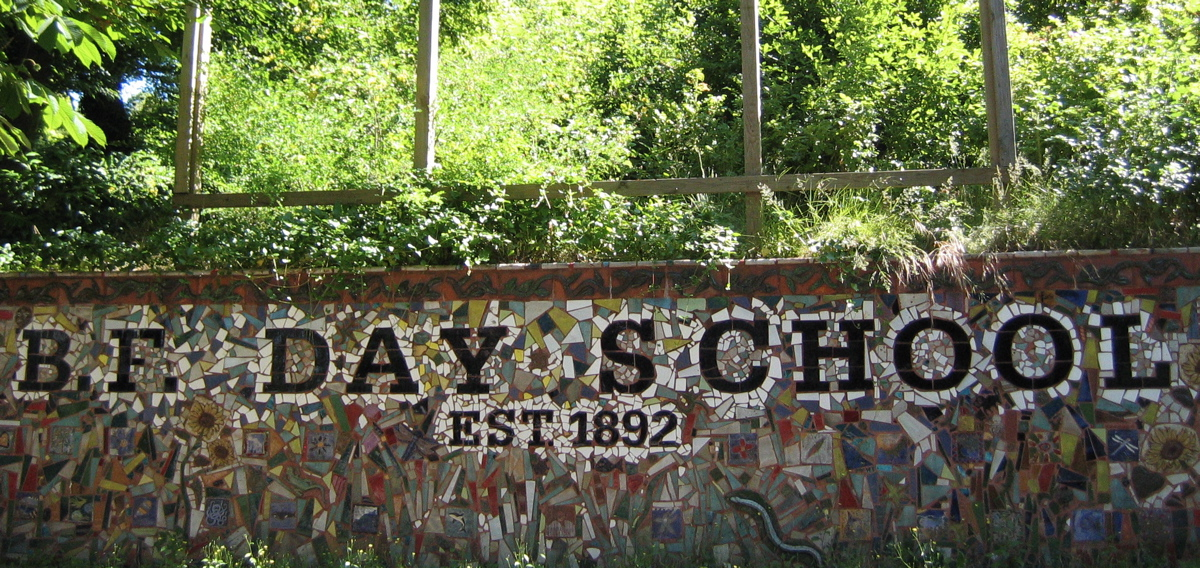
B.F. Day Elementary tile mosaic, created by students and locals

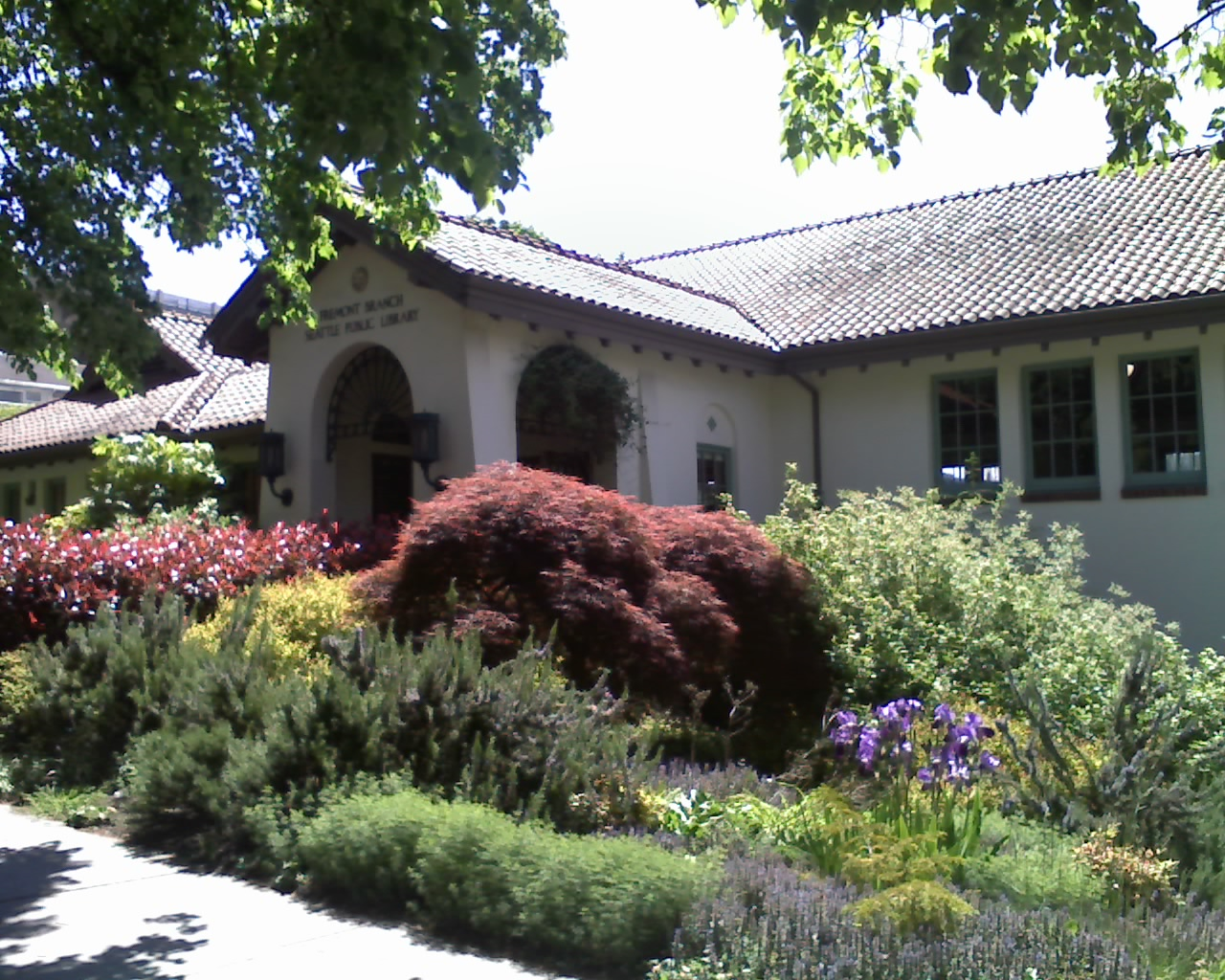
Fremont Branch of the Seattle Public Library
