= Fremont Trolley Barn =

Building in Seattle, Washington, U.S.

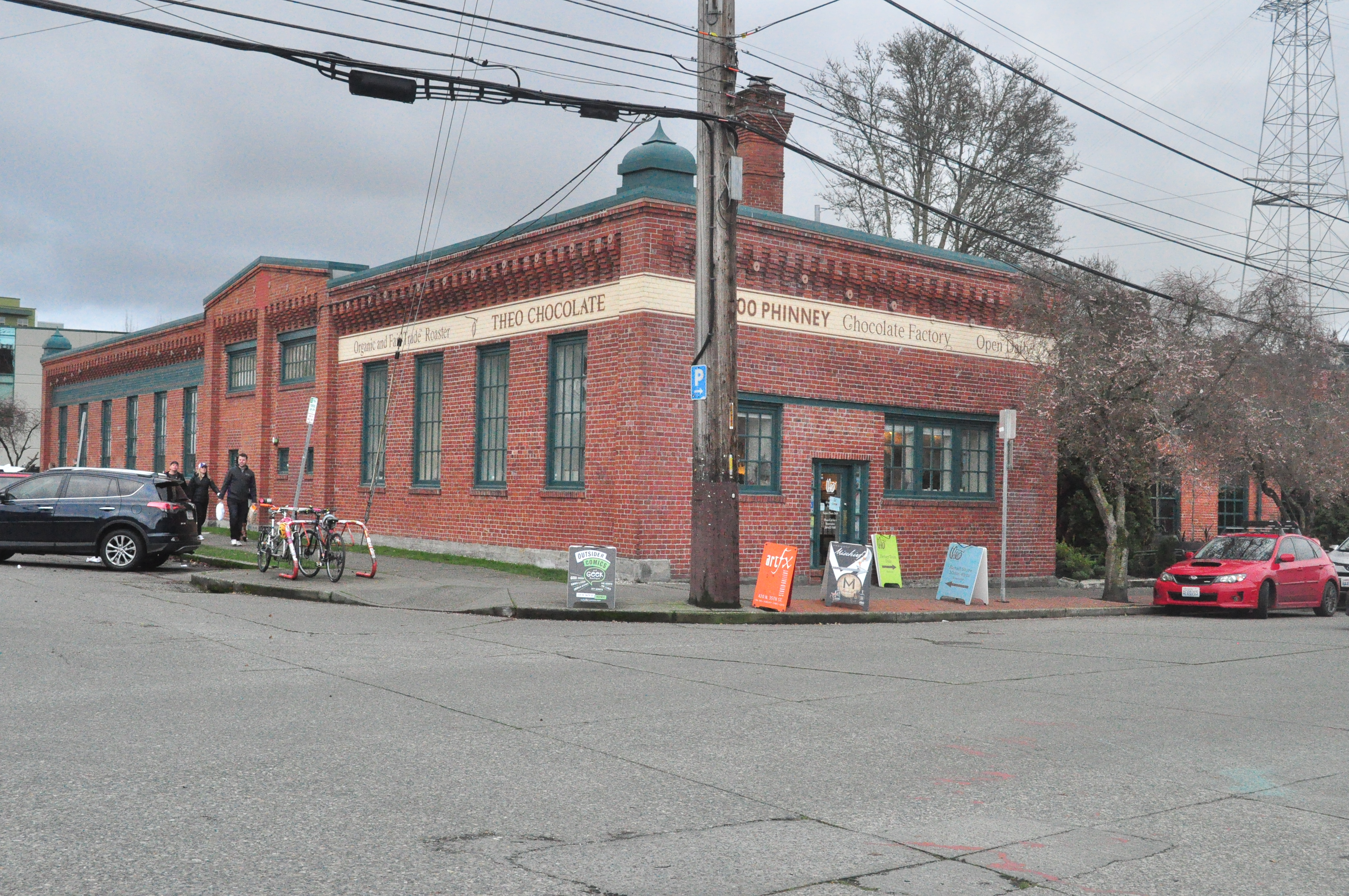
- Fremont Trolley Barn in 2017
- Interactive map of the Fremont Trolley Barn area
- Former names: Redhook Ale Brewery
- Alternative names: Theo Chocolate

General information
- Location: 3400 Phinney Ave N. Seattle, Washington, U.S.
- Coordinates: 47°39′03″N 122°21′15″W
- Completed: 1905

Seattle Landmark
- Designated: September 20, 1989

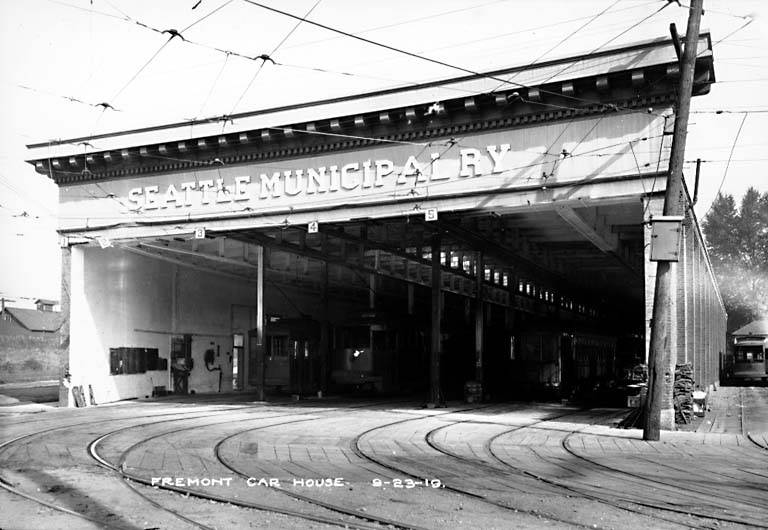
Fremont Trolley Barn in use by Seattle Municipal Railway, 1919.

Fremont Trolley Barn is a building in the Fremont neighborhood of Seattle, Washington, United States. Originally built as a carbarn (maintenance and operations base) for trolley cars, it has served numerous purposes during its years of existence (including as a warehouse and garage for garbage trucks) and is widely remembered as the brewery for Redhook Ale, considered by many to be Seattle's first craft beer brewery. Redhook brewed here from 1988 until 1998, when they moved to a larger site in Woodinville. The building then functioned as the production center of Seattle-based chocolatiers Theo Chocolate, who, however, announced in 2023 the closure of their Seattle manufacturing facility in this building. On February 16, 2025, the store was closed entirely. The Fremont Trolley Barn was designated a Seattle Landmark on September 20, 1989.

== History ==
Built in 1905 by Boston engineering firm Stone & Webster at a cost of $31,225 (equivalent to roughly $850,000 today), the building started out as storage space for Seattle's streetcars, its yard being large enough to accommodate up to 60 vehicles. It is also known to have been used as a trainsmen's quarters and repair shop during this time. The city's streetcar network continued to expand with over 400 vehicles in operation by the mid-1930s; however, the increasing dilapidation of the vehicles led city authorities to switch the network over to buses and trackless trolleys. The last streetcar pulled into the barn on April 13, 1941; the building was subsequently taken over by the army and used for storage space during World War II.

After the war the building was used by the Seattle Disposal Company to house garbage trucks and continued in this function for nearly 40 years. During the late 1980s it began to be leased by Quadrant Corp. in preparation for the eventual takeover by Redhook Ale Brewery, who had previously been operating out of a former transmission shop in the Ballard neighborhood. By 1991 the brewery had gone from producing 40,000 to 75,000 barrels of beer per year. The building also housed a pub named the Trolleyman, named in honor of its original function.

Continued growth saw Redhook open a much larger brewing facility in Woodinville in 1994; in 1998 the company stopped production at the former trolley barn, with the Trolleyman pub closing four years later. From 2006 the building was the production center and home of Theo Chocolate, the first organic, fair-trade certified chocolate makers in North America. Around 60,000 visitors toured the factory each year. Chocolate manufacturing at this location, however, ended in or shortly after 2023. As of 2025, their flagship store was still operating in the building, but that store closed entirely on February 16, 2025.
