= Twizzlers =

American soft licorice-type candy

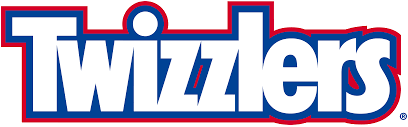

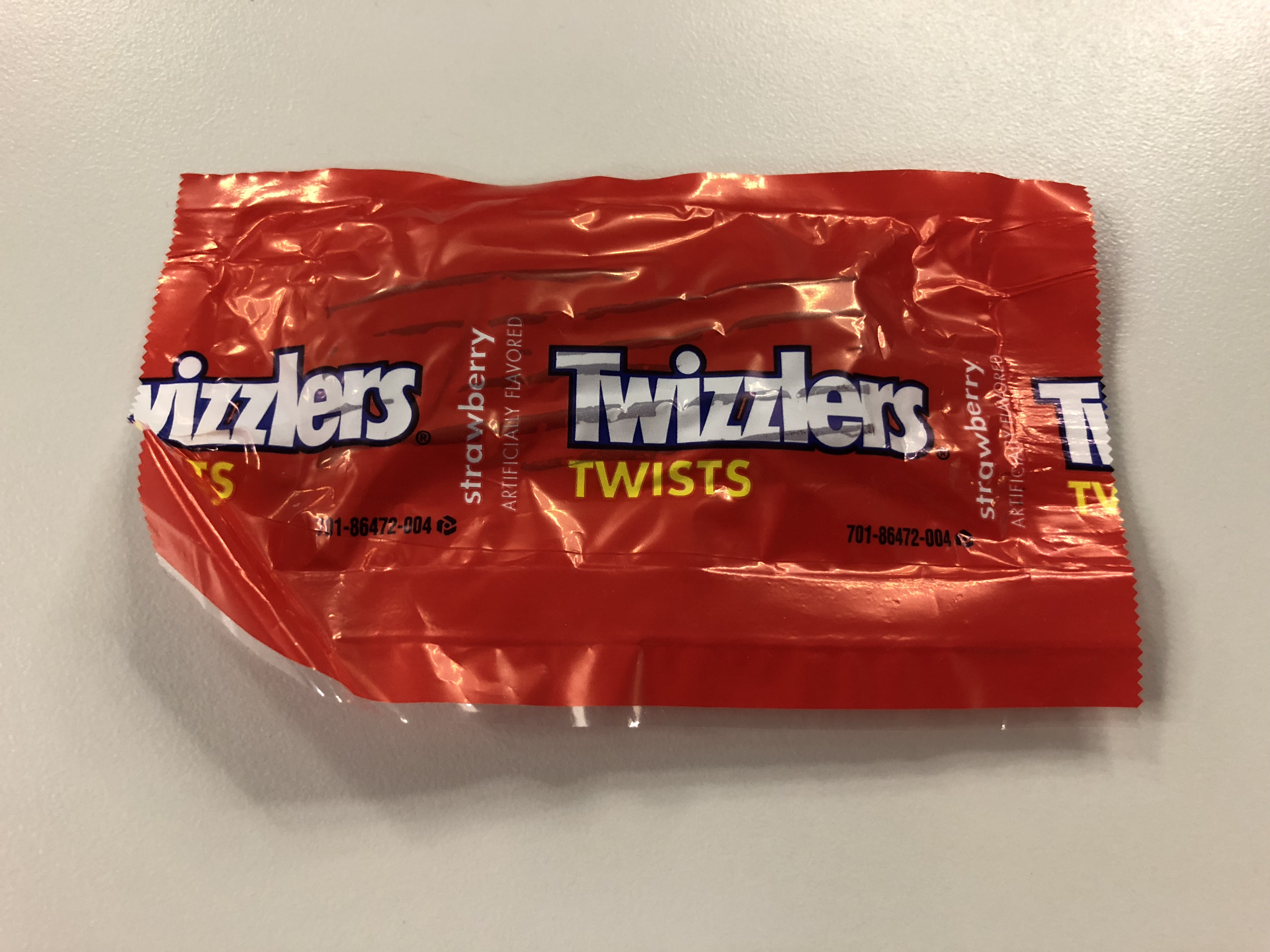
- Product type: Candy
- Current owner: The Hershey Company
- Produced by: Y&S Candies, Inc.
- Country: United States
- Introduced: November 20, 1929; 96 years ago
- Markets: United States
- Tagline: The Twist You Can't Resist
- Website: hersheyland.com/twizzlers

Twizzlers are a licorice-type candy manufactured by Y&S Candies, Inc., which is headquartered in Lancaster, Pennsylvania, United States, and a division of The Hershey Company. Twizzlers were first produced in 1929 by Young and Smylie, as the company was then called. The licorice company was founded in 1845, making it one of the oldest confectionery firms in the United States. Twizzlers ingredients consist of corn syrup, wheat flour, sugar, cornstarch, and smaller amounts of palm oil, salt, artificial flavor, glycerin, citric acid, potassium sorbate, Red 40, and soy lecithin. Despite only the black Twizzlers containing extracts of the licorice plant, Twizzlers products are collectively referred to as licorice-type candy. Seventy percent of the annual production of Twizzlers are strawberry, the most popular Twizzlers flavor.

== Company history ==
The manufacturer of Twizzlers candy is one of the oldest confectionery firms in the United States. The company was established in 1845 as Young and Smylie, and it adopted Y&S as its trademark in 1870. National Licorice Company was created in 1902 through the merger of three small firms: Young & Smylie, S.V. & F.P. Schudder and H.W. Petherbridge. In 1908, a plant was opened in Montreal and in 1929 the Twizzlers brand was created. The company changed its name to Y&S Candies Inc. in 1968. Y&S Candies was acquired by Hershey Foods Corporation in November 1977 in a pooling-of-interests, then merged into Hershey in January 1982.

Since 1999, Twizzlers have been manufactured in Memphis, Tennessee, as well as Lancaster, in a Y&S plant that makes chewing gum and other candies. From 1970 through 1999, it was manufactured in Farmington, New Mexico, but relocated the operation to Memphis due to rising transportation costs. According to the Guinness Book of Records, the longest licorice twist ever made measured 1,200 feet (370 m) and 100 pounds (45 kg) and was made at the Y&S Candy Plant in Lancaster, Pennsylvania, in 1998.

== Nibs history ==
"Nib"-shaped licorice pre-dates the Twizzlers brand. Canadian department store Woodward's used the word to describe their licorice product in 1920.

National's Licorice Nibs launched in the United States by at least 1923, in sanitary glassine packaging. Canadian availability began by at least 1931. Pyramid and camel branding on packaging began in the 1930s and was used for decades. Even though the company sold nearly 50 million pounds of licorice products a year by 1975, in that year Y&S turned to a Madison Avenue ad firm to separately promote their products in an effort to differentiate Twizzlers from Nibs.

== Products ==
While the original flavor was licorice, in the middle 1970s the company began to expand its flavors to include strawberry, grape, chocolate, cherry, and watermelon flavors. Limited edition cherry cola and "rainbow" (fruit variety consisting of strawberry, orange, lemonade, watermelon, "blue raspberry", peach and grape) flavors were introduced in 2006. Today, all these flavors of "rainbow" Twizzlers are still sold in stores and movie theaters.

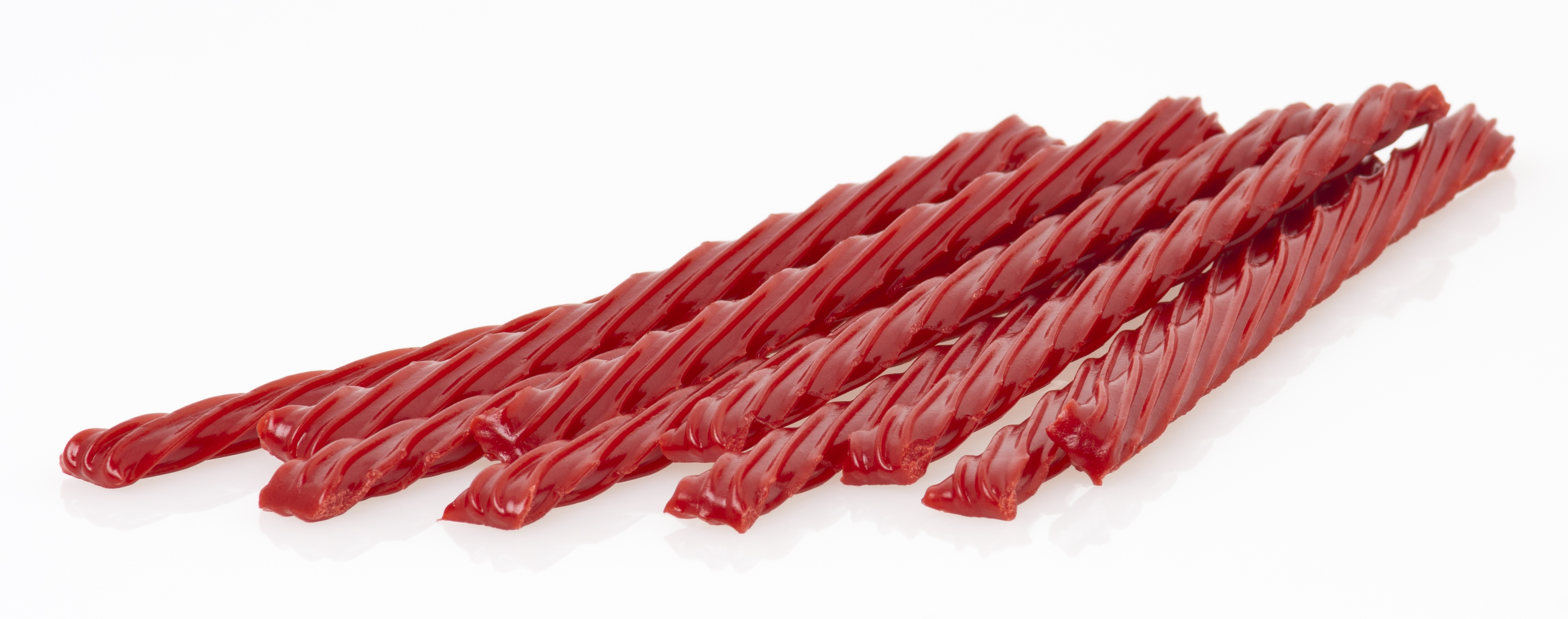
Strawberry Twizzlers

Twizzlers come in a variety of shapes and sizes. In addition to the original Twists, Nibs and Bites of various sizes, Y&S introduced Pull 'n' Peel in 1994. Twerpz and Strawz came along in 2004. The company also manufactures a special 2-foot-long (61 cm) variety; the regular length of Twizzlers is 8 inches (20 cm).

In December 2014, Twizzlers came out with Pull 'n' Peel Fruit Punch and Twizzlers filled Strawberry Lemonade varieties.

In December 2016, Twizzlers came out with Pull 'n' Peel Cherry and Green Apple and Twizzlers filled Strawberry Lemonade varieties.

All flavors of Pull 'n' Peel and Twists, and cherry and black licorice flavored Bites and Nibs are kosher certified by the Orthodox Union. Strawberry Twizzlers, cherry Pull 'n' Peel, Bites, Twists and Nibs, black licorice Twizzlers, and chocolate flavored Twizzlers do not contain animal gelatin or other animal products, and are approved as a vegan-edible candy.

== See also ==
- Red Vines
