= Evo (company) =

American company based in Seattle, Washington

- Company type: Privately held company
- Industry: Outdoor recreation; Retail; Sporting goods
- Founded: 2001; 24 years ago in Seattle, United States
- Founder: Bryce Phillps
- Headquarters: Seattle, Washington, United States
- Number of locations: 18 (2022)
- Area served: Canada; Japan; United States
- Key people: Bryce Phillips (founder, CEO)
- Number of employees: 750 (2022)
- Website: www.evo.com

Evo (stylized as evo) is an American sporting goods and outdoor recreation retailer. The company was founded in 2001 and is headquartered in Seattle, Washington. It is led by founder and chief executive officer Bryce Phillips.

== Company overview ==
Evo is an American sporting goods retailer and outdoor recreation company headquartered in Seattle, Washington. Evo generates about 70% of its business from online sales.

Evo operates nine stores in the United States and Canada and seven in Japan as Rhythm Japan.

Physical locations also offer equipment retail, repair services, and rentals. The company operates hotels in Salt Lake City, Utah, and Whistler, British Columbia, Canada. Evo offers travel packages via its evoTrip division.

== History ==
Phillips, a former professional skier, founded Evo in 2001 as an online retailer for used ski equipment. The company opened its first brick and mortar location in Seattle in 2005.

Evo expanded its physical presence in 2014 by opening a store in Portland, Oregon, and again in 2016 when it purchased Edgeworks & Bicycle Doctor in Denver, Colorado.

In 2018, Evo continued a series of acquisitions, starting with the purchase of independent retailer Whistler Village Sports in Whistler, British Columbia, including its five stores in Whistler Village, for an undisclosed sum. In 2021, the company acquired Callaghan Country Wilderness Adventures in Whistler, and with it a backcountry lodge called the Journeyman Lodge. In 2022, Evo purchased Rhythm Japan, a Japanese sporting goods retailer based in Australia, and its seven stores. Rhythm was founded in 2005 by Australian businessmen Matthew Hampton and Mick Klima and operates locations in Niseko, Hakuba, and Furano, Japan.

As part of its expansion into hospitality, in 2022 Evo opened a location in Salt Lake City including a hotel, bouldering gym, skatepark, and additional retail space. In July 2022, the company announced plans to build a similar complex in Tahoe City, California.

Evo purchased a city block in Seattle in 2022 for $17.5 million with plans to develop it into a mixed-use space that includes office space, sports facilities, and retail stores.

== Community initiatives ==
Evo has designed its physical locations to serve as gathering places as well as retail stores. The company's larger locations host events such as movie premieres and art galleries, include sports facilities such as skateparks and climbing gyms, and have additional retail spaces for local businesses and restaurants.

In 2021, Evo pledged to donate $10 million over the next 10 years to nonprofits that enable underrepresented communities to participate in outdoor activities.

== Evo outdoors ==
Evo outdoor was founded in 2001 as was expanded to operate outdoor retail stores and hotels specializing in winter sports in five U.S. states, Canada, and three prefectures in Japan. It is also based in Seattle, Washington. Evo was founded in Phillips' garage near its now located in Seattle's Fremont neighborhood. In February 2022, Evo opened Campus Salt Lake after spending $42 million developing the multi-experience facility in the Granary District.
