= Theo Chocolate =

American chocolate maker

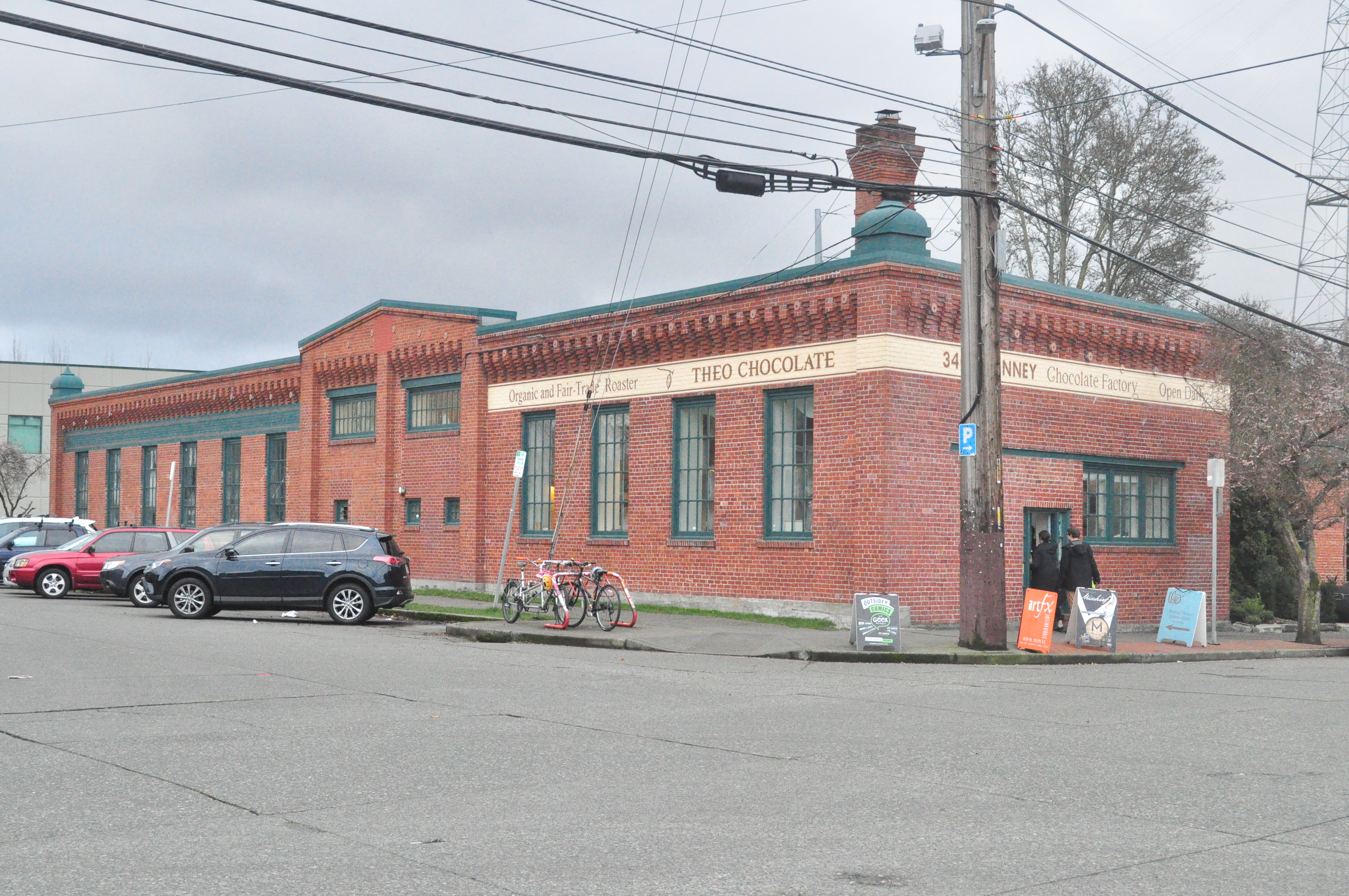
- Theo Chocolate in 2017
- Company type: Privately held company
- Industry: Food
- Founded: 2006
- Founder: Jeff Fairhall; Joe Whinney
- Headquarters: Seattle, Washington, U.S.
- Products: chocolate bar manufacturer; cocoa roaster
- Website: theochocolate.com

Theo Chocolate is an American chocolate company headquartered in Seattle, Washington. When it was established in 2006, it was the first organic fair trade-certified cocoa producer in the United States.

Theo has sourced beans from the Congo, Costa Rica, the Dominican Republic, Ecuador, Madagascar, Peru, and Venezuela.

== History ==
The business was established in 2006 by Jeff Fairhall and Joe Whinney in the Fremont neighborhood of Seattle. The business is located in the historic Fremont Trolley Barn at 3400 Phinney Avenue.

Jeff Fairhall, the founder of Seattle's Essential Baking Company, invested in the establishment of Theo Chocolate with Joe Whinney. When he was in his early 20s, Whinney volunteered with a small conservation foundation in Southern Belize that was looking at the way that communities cultivated their crops. He developed a passion for the Theobroma cacao plant and wanted to get into the business while supporting the farmers, and contacted 10 bean processors. One responded. While providing this business with organic materials and customers, Whinney was able to start saving up to found a chocolate business of his own.

The business struggled to find a good supply of organic cocoa beans and came to a halt in 2002. After finding an interested investor in Seattle, Washington, the decision was made to build the Theo Chocolate factory, named after the Theobroma cacao tree.

From 2004 to 2006 Fairhall sold all of his other business interests, retaining only Theo Chocolate. He published more than 30 advertisements in The Stranger about various religious ideas, revelations, and conspiracy theories. He also mentioned his use of magic mushrooms. Fairhall died of brain cancer in 2007.

In April 2018, Etienne Patout, a former Kellogg's executive, became the company's CEO.

In June 2023, the company announced it would be closing its Seattle based factory and laying off 60 employees in the second half of 2023 as part of a merger with American Licorice Company.

Also in June 2023, a class action lawsuit was filed against Theo Chocolate claiming at least three of its dark chocolate bars contained lead and cadmium.

On Feb 16, 2025, Theo Chocolate's flagship store at 3400 Phinney Ave. N Seattle, WA is permanently closed.

=== Products ===
Theo Chocolate sells chocolate bars in six different categories: Classic, Fantasy, Limited Edition, Baking and Holiday. The company also sells caramels and specialty items.

== Metal content ==
In a 2022 review conducted by independent testing company, Consumer Reports, two dark chocolate bars produced by Theo Chocolate were found to exceed California's maximum allowable dose level (MADL) for lead and cadmium. An ounce of the Theo Organic Pure Dark 70% Cocoa bar was found to include 120% of the maximum allowable dose of lead and 142% of the maximum allowable dose for cadmium. An ounce of the Theo Organic Extra Dark Pure Dark Chocolate 85% Cocoa was found to include 140% of the maximum allowable dose of lead and 189% of the maximum allowable dose for cadmium.

== Video case ==
Cengage Learning produced a 6:44-minute BizFlix video case titled "Theo Chocolate", which discusses the firm's fair trade practices and vertical integration.
