= American Licorice Company =

American confectionery manufacturer

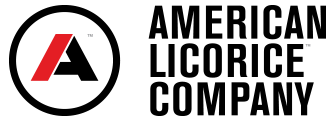
- Type: Private
- Industry: Confectionary
- Founded: 1914; 112 years ago
- Headquarters: La Porte, Indiana, U.S.
- Website: www.americanlicorice.com

American Licorice Company is an American candy manufacturer founded in Chicago, Illinois in 1914, and headquartered in La Porte, Indiana. The company has manufacturing facilities in Union City, California and La Porte.

== History ==
In 1925, the company began West operations in San Francisco, California. That same year, it produced a set of licorice shoes for Charlie Chaplin's character to eat in the film The Gold Rush.

In 1971, the San Francisco facility relocated to Union City, California.

In November 1999, American Licorice Co. joined with Ferrara Pan, Spangler, Goetze's, and NECCO to form the Candy Alliance LLC. The Alliance works to promote the mutual interests involved, through the coordination of ingredient purchasing to get lower prices, the creation of cooperative marketing and distribution programs, and the cross-licensing and development of joint products.

In 2008, The Food Network program Unwrapped featured a four-minute segment on the making of Sour Punch straws. As of 2008, American Licorice Company also manufactures the Sour Extinguishers brand of candy.

In 2011, workers at the American Licorice Company went on strike to maintain their healthcare benefits.

On 22 August 2012 the company recalled one pound bags of Red Vines Black Licorice Twists due to traces of lead.

On June 28, 2023, it was announced that American Licorice would merge with Seattle-based Theo Chocolate.

== Brands ==
- Snaps
- Red Vines
- Fruit Vines
- Sour Punch
- Super Ropes
- Sour Extinguishers
