= Fremont Peak Park =

Park in Seattle, Washington, United States

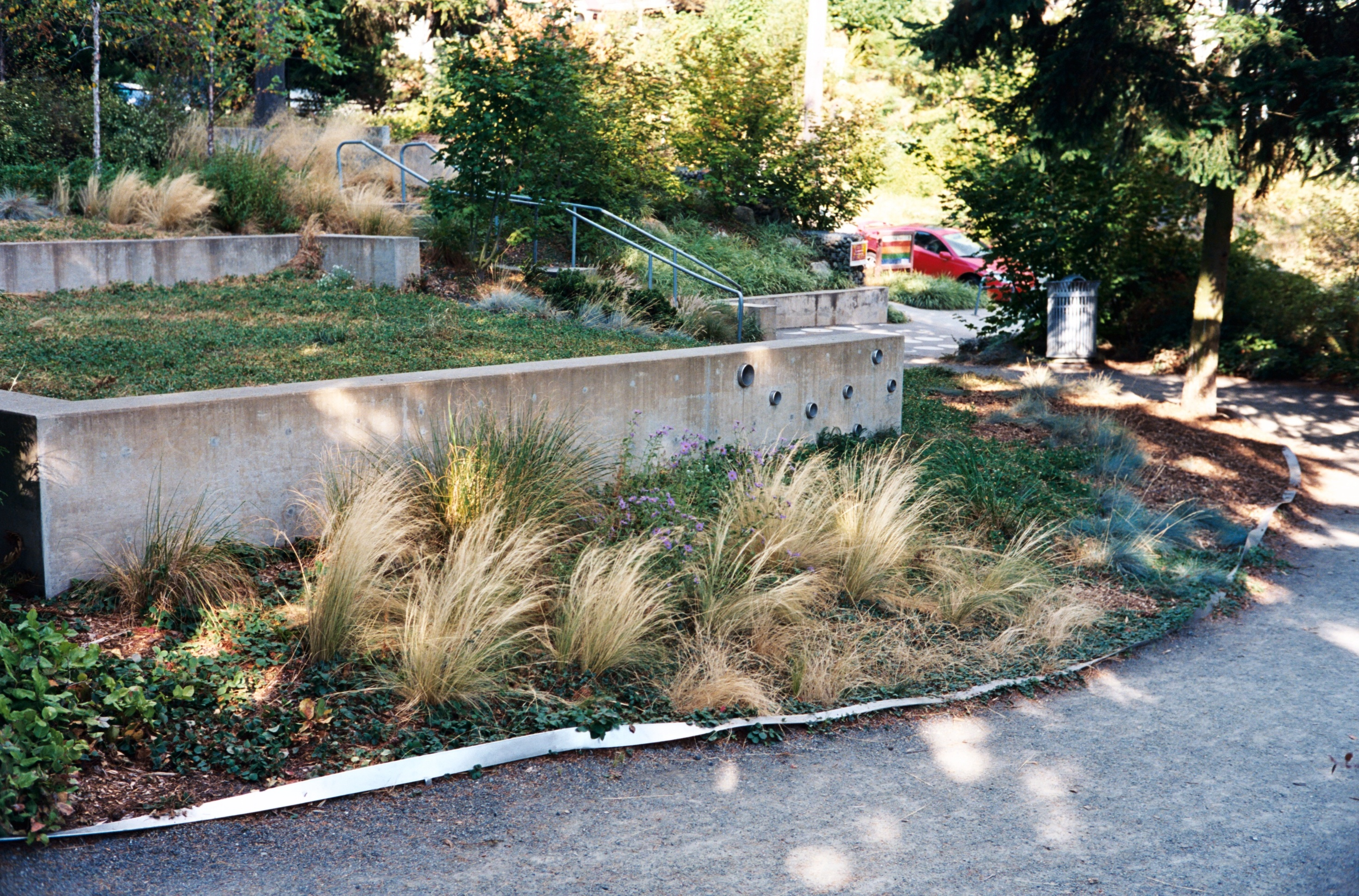
- Terraces in the park, 2012

- Location within Washington (state)
- Location: 4357 Palatine Avenue North, Seattle, Washington, Fremont neighborhood
- Coordinates: 47°39′40″N 122°21′24″W
- Area: 0.5 acres (0.20 ha)
- Opened: November 10, 2007
- Designer: Laura Haddad, Tom Drugan
- Administrator: Seattle Parks and Recreation
- Status: Open
- Website: Seattle Parks and Recreation

Fremont Peak Park is a 0.5-acre (0.20 ha) park located within the Fremont neighborhood of Seattle. The park was opened to the public on November 10, 2007.

== History ==
The grounds were previously under private ownership. The idea to convert the site to a recreational area began at the turn of the 21st century under the volunteer efforts of Jack Tomkinson, a resident in the Fremont community. A local organization known as "Urban Sparks" was formed to begin the process. Suzie Burke, known in the neighborhood as the "Queen of Fremont", has also been credited as a major factor in Fremont Peak Park's creation.

The three-parcel, private property site was placed for sale in January 2001 for $1.5 million and local efforts to obtain the lots by Tomkinson and Burke began immediately. A Fremont bank connected to Burke loaned her the funds for the purchase of the grounds. Despite a higher offer, Burke's more "bulletproof" proposal was accepted by the owner, Tony Murphy; he sold two of the parcels to her for a little more than $1.0 million. The third lot remained as a residential site for Murphy, who planned to sell it to the Seattle Parks and Recreation (SPD) department within two years.

A new volunteer group, focusing on converting the land into a park, was formed in 2001. Known as the Friends of Freemont Peak Park (FoFPP), the association continued to raise money through a variety of fundraising efforts, which included small, numerous donations from residents in Fremont. The financial support was meant to purchase the remaining parcel as well as to cover associated costs for the park's construction. Additional funding was procured via the Seattle Pro Parks Levy. In late 2002, the SPD purchased the two lots from Burke; she lost money on the sale as a new appraisal lowered the value of the land by $150,000. (Note: Burke considered the financial loss of the sale in 2002 as a donation on her part to the park despite stating that she "took it in the shorts".) Murphy died in 2003 and his estate sold the remaining lot to the SPD the following year.

Early clearing and construction included the removal of a view-obstructing elm tree; several invasive plant species such as blackberry and English ivy were removed as well. Existing homes were demolished though the foundations of the residences were kept, incorporated into a larger art design that was to convey a Crete-inspired "mythical labyrinth". Volunteers planted Garry oaks along with approximately 3,000 "drought-tolerant" plants.

The park's conversion was mostly a volunteer effort and was designed cooperatively by landscape artists Laura Haddad and Tom Drugan of Seattle along with architectural firm GGLO, the FoFPP, and the SPD.

Fremont Peak Park officially opened during a ribbon cutting ceremony on November 10, 2007. Continuing stewardship of the park has been primarily through the efforts of the FoFPP.

== Geography ==
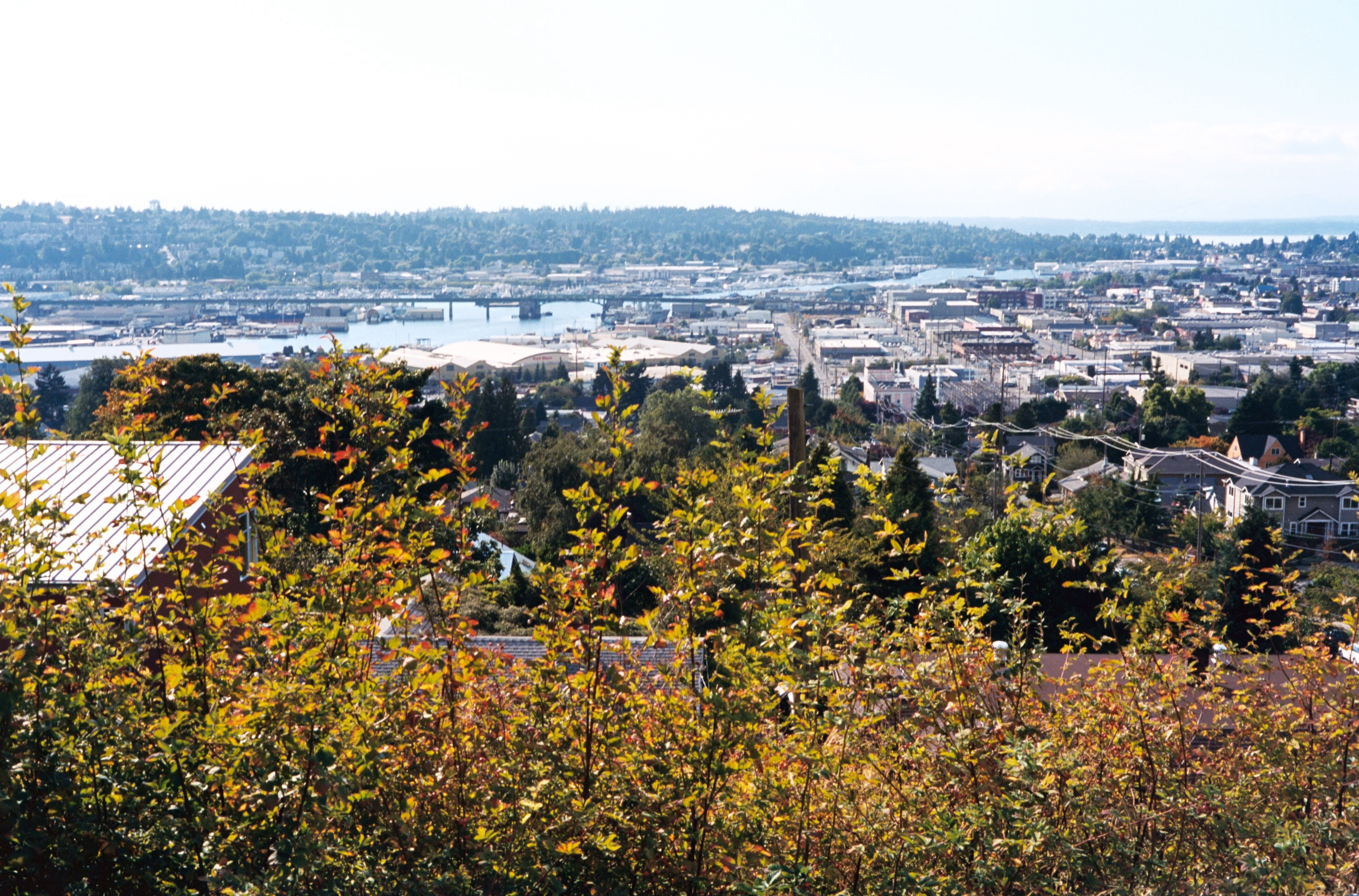
Salmon Bay, Ballard, and Magnolia seen from Fremont Peak Park, 2012

The 0.5-acre (0.20 ha) park is located on a bluff in Fremont, Seattle between Palatine Avenue North and First Avenue Northwest. The site is approximately 5 blocks south of Woodland Park Zoo and was once three separate residential lots. Before the land's conversion into a park, the owner of the lots intentionally planted Douglas fir and Western red cedar over a span of 40 years.

== Features ==
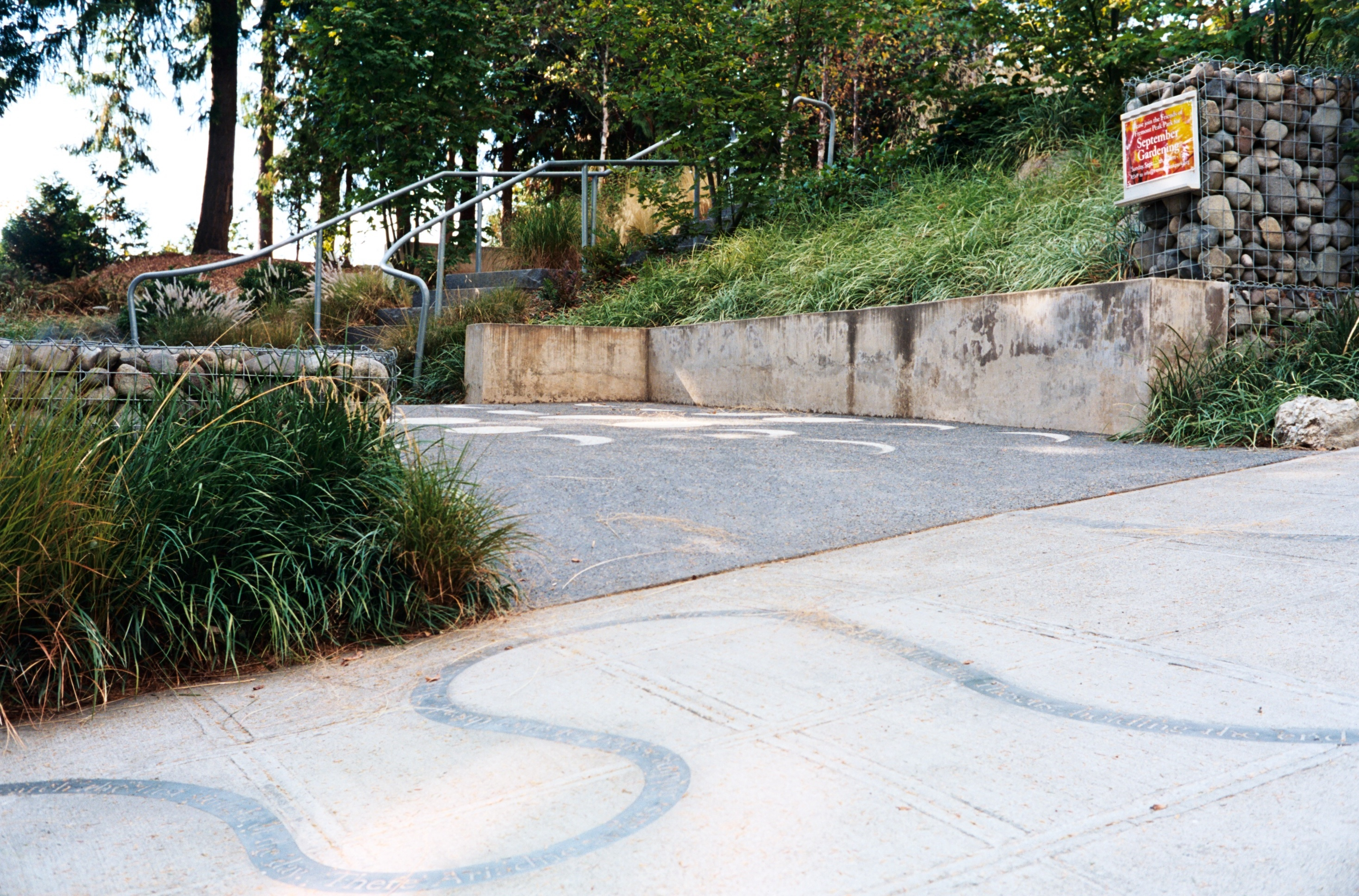
Sidewalk art at park entrance, 2012

The park features several public art pieces, including a statue at the entrance that continues as a ribbon-like artwork that follows the park's trail. The piece is etched with text that describes a story of the Minotaur and a connected adventure of Theseus and Ariadne from Greek mythology. A work depicting phases of the moon follows and the pathway cuts through a grouping of conifers. A maze-like feature contains references to constellations. Located near the center of the grounds is a terraced feature containing a circular display of spheres and lines. The display functions as an equinox and solstice marker.

Visitors to the site are afforded views of Lake Washington Ship Canal, Mount Rainier, the Olympic Mountains, and Puget Sound.
