= Bateau (restaurant) =

Steakhouse in Seattle, Washington, U.S.

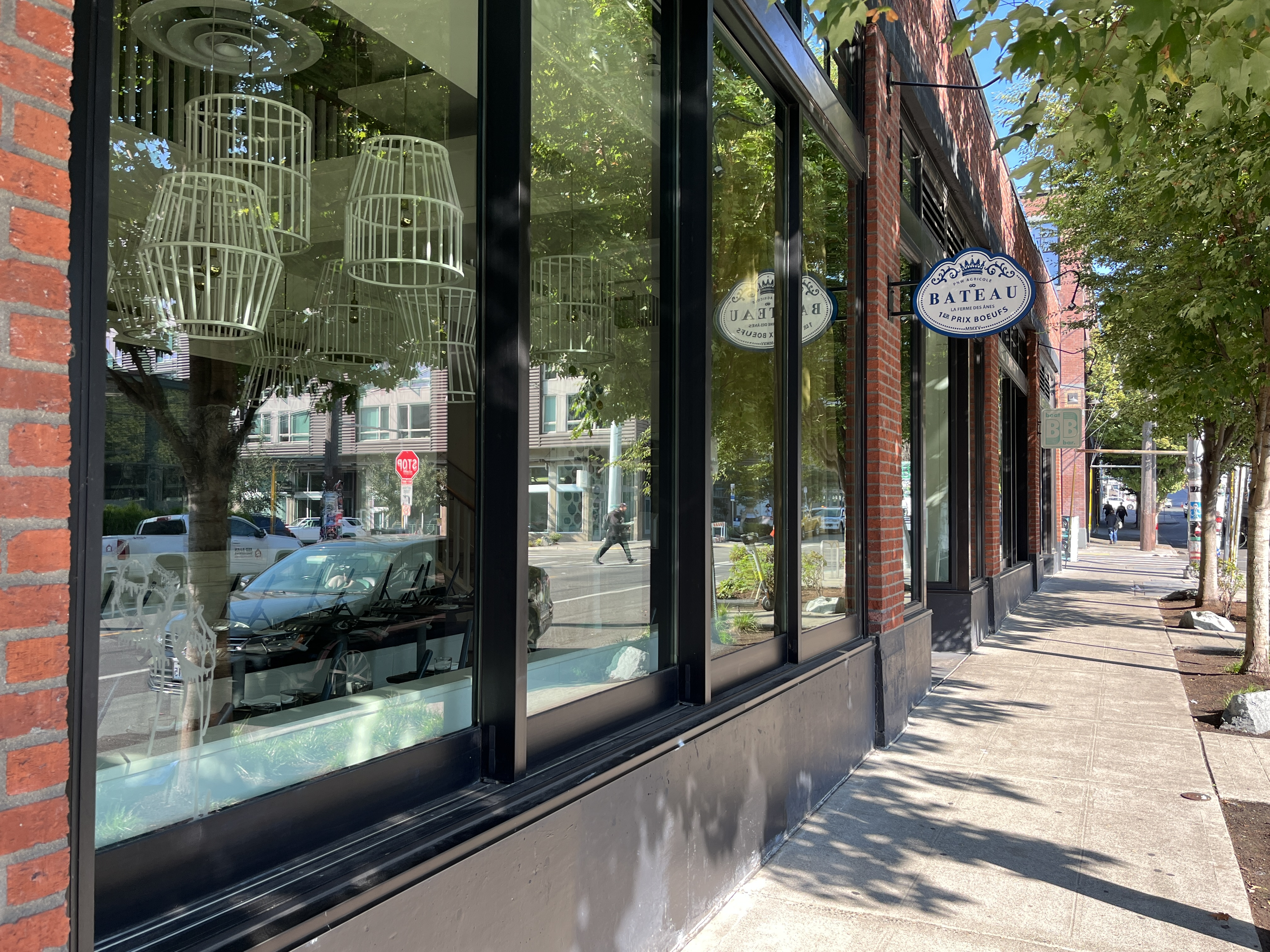
- The restaurant's exterior, 2022
- Interactive map of Bateau

Restaurant information
- Established: November 2015
- Owners: Renee Erickson, Jeremy Price
- Food type: Steakhouse
- Location: 1040 E Union Street, Seattle, Washington
- Coordinates: 47°36′47″N 122°19′7″W
- Website: https://restaurantbateau.com/

Bateau was a steakhouse in Seattle, in the U.S. state of Washington. The restaurant was founded by chef Renee Erickson.

== History ==
The restaurant opened in 2015. Bateau makes an effort to reduce the environmental impact of the beef it serves. One such practice to minimize the restaurant's impact, whole-animal butchery, means the restaurant serves cuts that other steakhouses do not typically serve.

The restaurant closed temporarily during the 2021 Western North America heat wave.

In June 2025, Bateau was temporarily closed as part of a "planned reimagining." The closure came soon after a successful union authorization vote in February 2025, which raised suspicion of union busting. Bateau is slated to reopen in 2026, despite not having negotiated a contract with the union.

== Reception ==
The restaurant has received mixed reviews from critics. In a review for The Seattle Times, critic Providence Cicero gave the restaurant her first four-star review. Cicero praised the "entire dining experience" as "smooth sailing". Cicero specifically praised the quality of the service and the knowledge of the waitstaff. The review also referred to the meat as "exceptional" and highlighted the "sides and starters" as "[playing] more than just a supporting role". On the other hand, Infatuation Seattle said "it's hard to muster up a single use case for Bateau, other than to pocket a couple of complimentary mint chocolate meringues and enjoy a plate of their standout fries."

The restaurant was featured on Eater's list of the best new restaurants of 2016. Aimee Rizzo included Spinasse in The Infatuation's 2023 overview of Seattle's 25 best restaurants.
