= Snaps (candy) =

Brand of confectionery

Snaps are a brand of classic chewy candy, manufactured by American Licorice Company. They have hollow centers and are colored white, orange, green, and pink.
