= The Whale Wins =

Restaurant in Seattle, Washington, U.S.

- Interactive map of The Whale Wins

Restaurant information
- Food type: American; French
- Location: Seattle, King, Washington, United States
- Coordinates: 47°38′58.5″N 122°20′32.5″W

The Whale Wins (rebranded The Whale Wins Cafe and Larder in 2020) was a restaurant by Renee Erickson in Seattle's Fremont-Wallingford area, in the U.S. state of Washington. It closed permanently in late October 2025.

== Description ==
The Whale Wins is a restaurant in a building in Seattle's Fremont-Wallingford area. The vegetable-focused American and French menu has also included roast chicken, trout, rabbit terrine, sardines on toast, and butter-roasted zucchini bread.

== History ==
Erickson opened The Whale Wins with partners Chad Dale and Jeremy Price in 2012. The restaurant's interior was designed by Heliotrope Architects. The business has shared a space with Joule. Erickson eliminated tips in 2015 and removed chinook salmon from her restaurants' menus in 2018. Like many restaurants, The Whale Wins closed temporarily in March 2020 upon the arrival of the COVID-19 pandemic. The Whale Wins became The Whale Wins Cafe and Larder, described by Eater Seattle as "a hybrid cafe and retail shop with counter service only".

== Reception ==
In 2013, The Whale Wins was food writer Andrew Knowlton's selection for the ninth best restaurant in the United States. The Seattle Times said the restaurant offered the city's happy hour in 2014. Bill Addison included The Whale Wins in Eater's 2015 and 2016 lists of 38 restaurants which "define American dining". In 2022, Matthew Lombardi, Gabe Guarente, and Jade Yamazaki Stewart included The Whale Wins Larder and Cafe in Eater Seattle's list of 15 "fantastic" Fremont restaurants.

Aimee Rizzo of The Infatuation wrote in 2022, "The menu has a ton of vegetables, and the portions are so small that you’ll spending a lot of money only to likely be hungry in an hour—but we can't deny that this place works incredibly well for a light snack and glass of wine." Seattle Metropolitan included the restaurant in 2023 list of Seattle's best lunch destinations. The magazine's Allecia Vermillion also included the business in a 2023 list of restaurants with "perfect patios for sunny days".

Fodor's says, "The vegetable plates are unfailingly excellent, but everything that comes out of the kitchen seems blessed... A plate of sardines on toast for the table is a must, even if you don't think you like sardines. Order family-style so that you can sample as many dishes as possible."
