= Goetze's Candy Company =

US confectionery company

Goetze's Candy Company, Inc.
- Formerly: Baltimore Chewing Gum Company (1895–1948)
- Type: Private
- Industry: Confectionery
- Founded: 1895; 131 years ago
- Founder: August Goetze; William Goetze
- Headquarters: 3900 E Monument St, Baltimore, Maryland, U.S.
- Area served: United States
- Key people: Mitchell Goetze (CEO)
- Products: Caramel Creams, Cow Tales
- Revenue: US $25-$100 million (2022)
- Owner: Goetze family
- Number of employees: 120 (2021)
- Website: www.goetzecandy.com

Goetze's Candy Company, Inc. (/ˈɡɛtsɪz/ GETS-iz) is an American confectionery company based in Baltimore, Maryland, specializing in caramel-based candies. Goetze's was established in 1895 as the Baltimore Chewing Gum Company by August Goetze and his son, William. In 1917, the family developed a soft, caramel candy (known as "Chu-ees") which ultimately evolved into their signature candy, Caramel Creams (also known as Bull's Eyes), a soft chewy caramel with cream filling in the center. Each candy is packaged in a predominantly clear wrapper and twisted at two red and white ends.

== Products ==
Caramel Creams, the flagship product.

In addition to its signature caramel candy, the company also makes a different style of its classic caramel candy, Cow Tales. Goetze's Cow Tales were originally launched in the year 1984. Cow Tales are similar to the Caramel Creams, but in the form of a long, thin cylinder of soft caramel with a cream center. Cow Tales are also produced in Vanilla, Chocolate, Strawberry, Caramel Apple, and Honey Bun flavors. In addition, the company offers Mini Cow Tales, a bite-sized version of Vanilla Cow Tales, Goetze's number-one selling 25-cent item.

Over the years, the company experimented with several flavors, such as peanut butter and banana. As of 2009, the Caramel Creams lineup included "Original" (Vanilla), Chocolate, Strawberry, and Caramel Apple flavors.

According to the manufacturer, Goetze's caramels have always been made with a low fat, low sodium, no cholesterol recipe and are made with wheat flour, dairy milk and cream ingredients.

== Honors ==
In 1984, R. Melvin Goetze, a third-generation family member (who joined the company in 1935), was inducted into the Candy Hall of Fame by the National Confectionery Sales Association of America. Spaulding A. Goetze Sr. was inducted into the Candy Hall of Fame in 1998. Rick LaRue, Goetze's former National Sales Manager, was inducted into the Candy Hall of Fame while working at Goetze's, in October 2006, and Tony Gazzola, one of Goetze's Regional Sales Managers, was inducted into the Candy Hall of Fame while working at Goetze's, in October 2007. Mitchell Goetze, one of the fifth generation family members, became the Executive Vice Chairman of the National Confectioners Association in 2008, and became the Chairman of the NCA two years later. John Leipold, Goetze's Director Sales & Marketing, was inducted into the Candy Hall of Fame in October 2009.
