= Red Vines =

Brand of red licorice candy

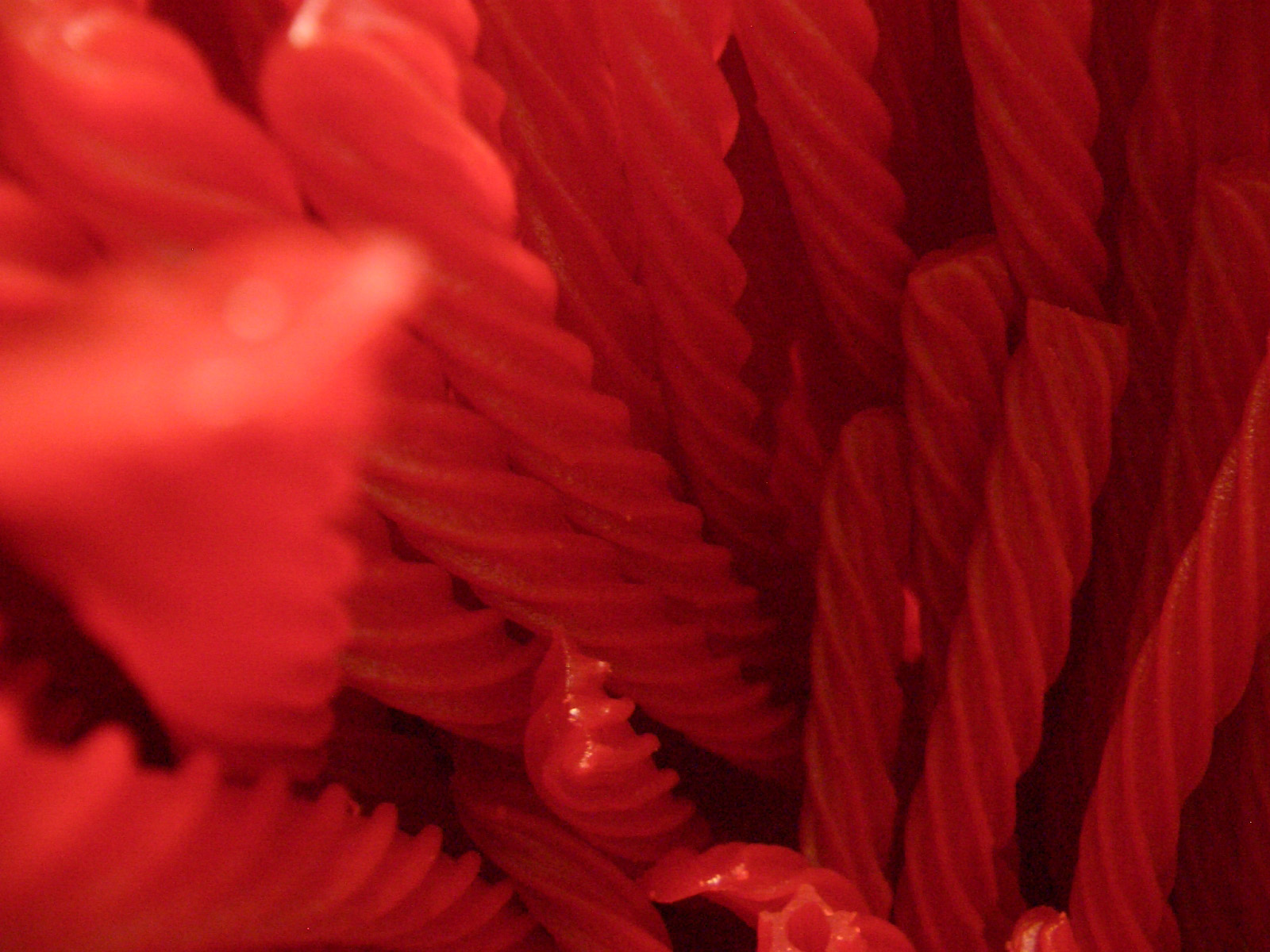
Red Vines

Red Vines is a brand of red licorice candy manufactured in Union City, California by the American Licorice Company. Red Vines Original Red Twists are also sometimes referred to as red licorice despite containing no licorice root. The original Red Vines were raspberry-flavored but, in 1952, with a slight formula change, the Red Vines Original Red Twist flavor was introduced.

== Development ==
The American Licorice Company introduced raspberry-flavored vines in the 1920s. In the 1950s, the name was changed to Red Vines and the company's branding was reimagined around this identity, with "Original Red" eventually overtaking licorice as the most popular flavor.

In the Union City factory, wheat flour, corn syrup, citric acid, flavoring, and dye is blended in vats, then poured into barrels and cooled for 24 hours, after which it is extruded through a machine that forms the final candy. The factory can produce up to 1,000,000 pounds per week.

== Twizzlers rivalry ==
Red Vines and similar candy Twizzlers have a perceived rivalry such as displayed in the Parks and Recreation episode "Ben's Parents," in which characters are divided over which is better and whether families from different sides of the question can appropriately marry.

According to the brand manager of Red Vines, "The taste and the texture are very different and the rivalry between Twizzlers and Red Vines is very fan-driven. The rivalry is [similar to] the Montagues and Capulets. It's existed for so long that people forget how it started [but] it's not driven by either company." He speculates that the rivalry is essentially regional, as Red Vines are more popular in the West and the Great Lakes region "but brand awareness tends to drop off once you go east of Denver," while Twizzlers, being "headquartered in Pennsylvania" trends stronger there and in the East Coast and Northeast.

== August 2012 recall ==
In August 2012 the California Department of Public Health announced a recall of one lot of Red Vines' black licorice candy due to lead contamination. Only the one-pound packages marked "Best Before 020413" were recalled. Testing found that candy in the contaminated lot had as much as 0.33 parts per million of lead resulting in up to 13.2 micrograms of lead per serving. This was more than double the limit of 6.0 micrograms of lead per day from all dietary sources for children under 6 years old.

== In popular culture ==
Fox science-fiction drama television series Fringe frequently refers to Red Vines throughout its five-season run, as it is the preferred candy of the character Doctor Walter Bishop. In the season 2 premiere, "A New Day in the Old Town," he is even seen eating Red Vines while conducting an autopsy. After the TV series was renewed for a fourth season on March 24, 2011, co-star Josh Jackson publicly stated his appreciation of Fringe fans for sending Red Vines to Fox in an effort to campaign for a renewal.

Red Vines were airdropped into 89th Academy Awards ceremony by host Jimmy Kimmel.

Red Vines are frequently mentioned in Team StarKid's 2010 musical, A Very Potter Sequel, as they are the preferred snack of Ron Weasley. This was later referenced in 2011, when Joey Richter and Joe Walker, two actors from the musical, performed a series of tests on the official Red Vines YouTube channel, to see what Red Vines could and couldn't do.

Red Vines is also the name of an Aimee Mann song from her 1999 album Bachelor No. 2 or, the Last Remains of the Dodo. The chorus talks about "...Cigarettes and Red Vines," as something to occupy one's time while helplessly watching other events.

== See also ==
- Twizzlers
