= Renee Erickson (chef) =

American chef

- Born: 1972 (age 53–54)
- Writing career
- Genre: Non-fiction
- Subject: Food

Renee Erickson (born 1972) is a Seattle-based chef and restaurateur. Owner and chef at a group of six Seattle restaurants, Erickson won the 2016 James Beard Award for Best Chef: Northwest.

Erickson began her restaurant career while an art student at the University of Washington: needing a job to afford her studies, she worked for some years at the restaurant Boat Street, but then unexpectedly was offered the opportunity to buy it when she was 25. Though she had planned to go back to school, she accepted and bought Boat Street. A business partner eventually persuaded her to expand further and she has become owner and chef of a group of restaurants in Seattle, including Bar Melusine, Bateau, Boat Street Cafe, The Whale Wins, Barnacle, and The Walrus and the Carpenter. Bon Appetit titled a 2016 profile of Erickson and her restaurants, "Why Seattle Is One of the Most Exciting Places to Eat in the Country," and compared Erickson to M.F.K. Fisher, Elizabeth David, and Julia Child in her generational significance as a chef.

In 2014, Erickson published a cookbook called A Boat, a Whale & a Walrus. Eater described it as a cookbook while also part narrative and memoir. It has 70 recipes organized into seasonal meals.

Erickson has been a prominent supporter of Seattle's minimum wage increase, adopting the $15 minimum hourly wage five years ahead of the legal mandate.
